= Door County, Wisconsin =

County in Wisconsin, United States

- County
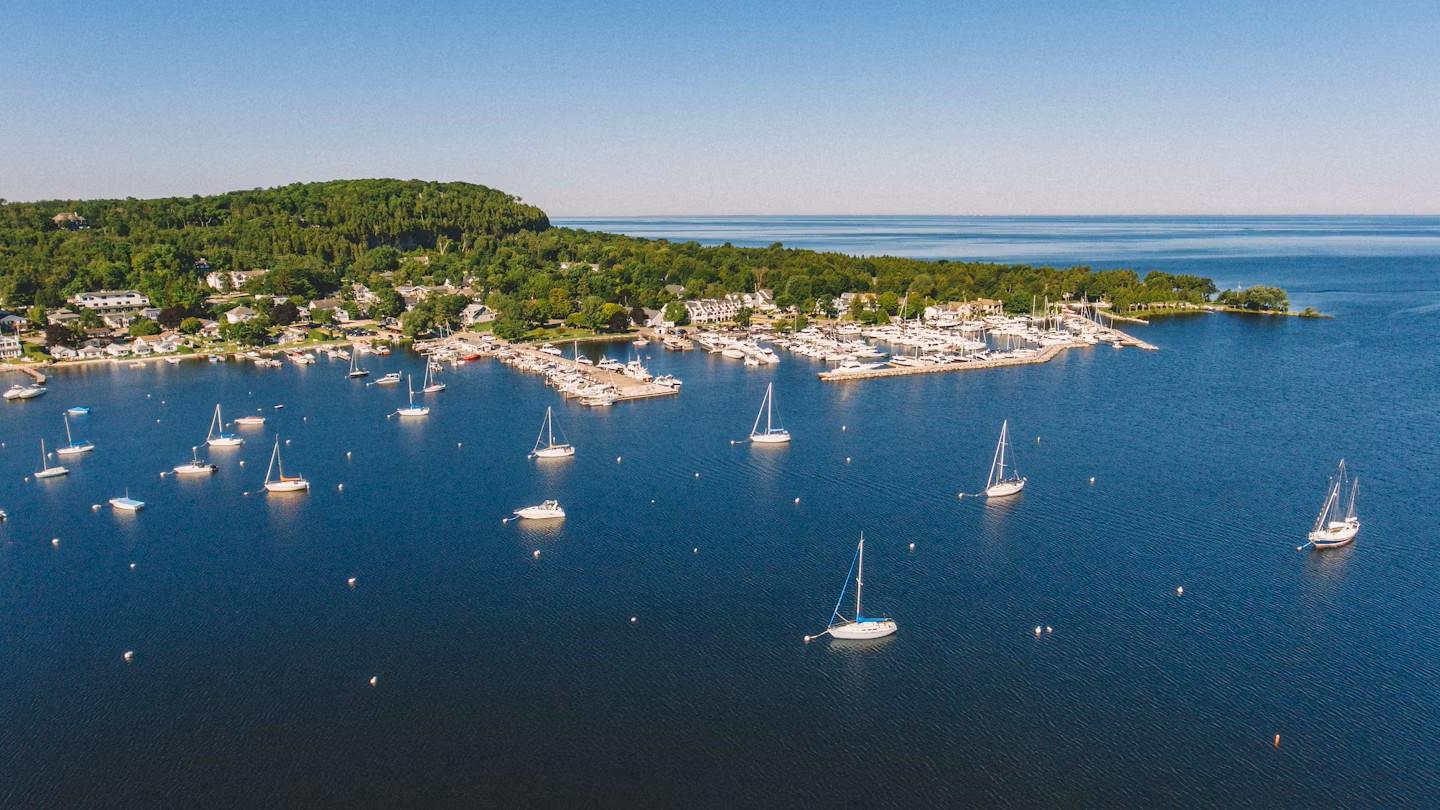
- Fish Creek

- Location within the U.S. state of Wisconsin
- Coordinates: 45.02°N 87.01°W
- Country: United States
- State: Wisconsin
- Founded: 1851
- Named for: Porte des Morts
- Seat: Sturgeon Bay
- Largest city: Sturgeon Bay

Area
  - Total: 2,370 sq mi (6,100 km^{2})
  - Land: 482 sq mi (1,250 km^{2})
  - Water: 1,888 sq mi (4,890 km^{2}) 80%

Population (2020)
  - Total: 30,066
  - Estimate (2025): 30,616 ▲
  - Density: 62.4/sq mi (24.1/km^{2})
- Demonym: Door Countyite
- Time zone: UTC−6 (Central)
  - Summer (DST): UTC−5 (CDT)
- Area code: 920
- Congressional district: 8th
- Website: co.door.wi.gov
- Wisconsin county code 15; FIPS county code 55029

Door County is the easternmost county in the U.S. state of Wisconsin. Its population was 30,066 at the 2020 census. Its county seat and largest city is Sturgeon Bay, with a population of 9,646.

Door County is named after the strait between the Door Peninsula and Washington Island. This dangerous passage, known as Death's Door, contains shipwrecks and was known to Native Americans and early French explorers. The county was created in 1851 and organized in 1861.

Nicknamed the "Cape Cod of the Midwest," Door County is a popular Upper Midwest vacation destination. Tourism is a major contributor to Door County's economy. It is Wisconsin's forty-fourth largest county in population, but it is the eighth largest in terms of economic impact from tourism (over $600 million in 2023). The county is considered a high-recreation retirement destination by the U.S. Department of Agriculture.

== History ==
=== Native Americans and French ===
Door County's name came from Porte des Morts ("Death's Door"), the passage between the tip of Door Peninsula and Washington Island. The name "Death's Door" came from Native American tales, heard by early French explorers and published in greatly embellished form by Hjalmar Holand, which described a failed raid by the Ho-Chunk (Winnebago) tribe to capture Washington Island from the rival Potawatomi tribe in the early 1600s. It has become associated with shipwrecks within the passage. The earliest known written reference to the legend is from Emmanuel Crespel, who termed the peninsula "Cap a la Mort" in 1728.

=== Development ===
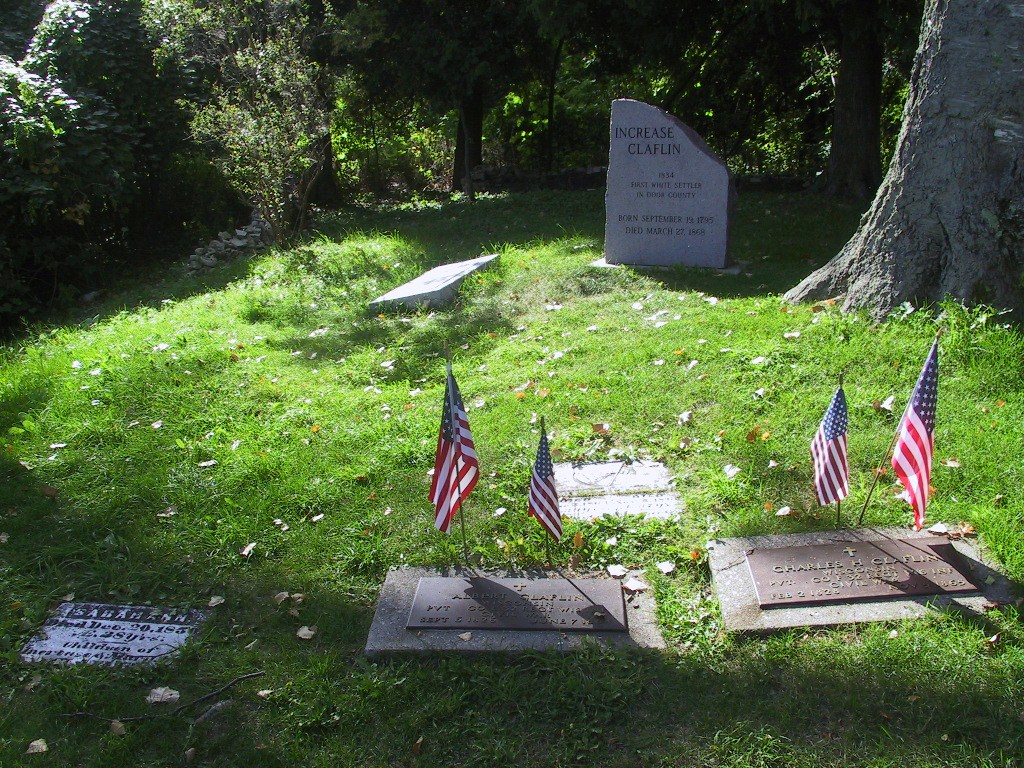
Graves of Increase Claflin and family

The 19th and 20th centuries saw the immigration and settlement of pioneers, mariners, fishermen, loggers, and farmers. The first white settler was Increase Claflin. In 1851, Door County was separated from what had been Brown County. In 1853, Moravians founded Ephraim after Nils Otto Tank resisted attempts at land ownership reform at the old religious colony near Green Bay. An African-American community and congregation worshiping at West Harbor on Washington Island was described in 1854. Also in 1854 the first post office in the county opened, on Washington Island. In the 19th century, a fairly large-scale immigration of Belgian Walloons populated a small region in the southern portion of the county, including the area designated as the Namur Historic District. They built small roadside votive chapels, some still in use today, and brought other traditions over from Europe such as the Kermiss harvest festival.

Shortly after the 1831 Treaty of Washington, the federal government surveyed what is now Door County to determine the value of the timber and to divide up parcels for eventual sale. Following the treaty, land in what is now the county was sold or granted to private citizens.

At the time the Homestead Act of 1862 was passed, most of the county's nearly 2,000 farmers were squatters earning most of their revenue from lumber and wood products. The remaining portion of the population consisted of about 1,000 fishermen and their families. Out of the total population of 2,948 people, 170 fought in the Civil War.

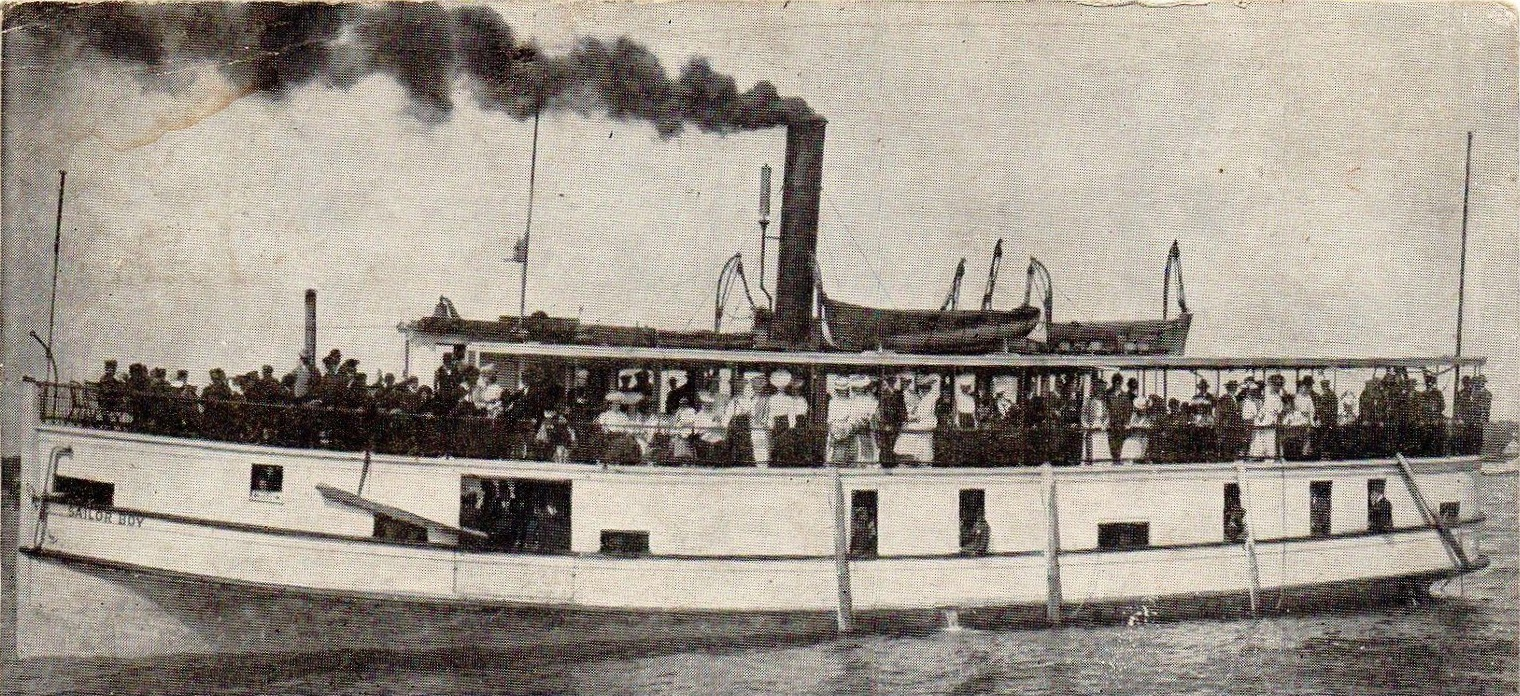
Excursion party on the Sailor Boy; postmarked 1906 in Sturgeon Bay. The Sailor Boy and other small steamboats stopped at Menominee to take on rail passengers. Since rail service was faster, tourists from Chicago would first take a northbound train in order to board steamboats bound for resort communities.

When the 1871 Peshtigo fire burned the town of Williamsonville, fifty-nine people were killed. The area of this disaster is now Tornado Memorial County Park, named for a fire whirl which occurred there. Altogether, 128 people in the county perished in the Peshtigo fire.

In 1885 or 1886, what is now the Coast Guard Station was established at Sturgeon Bay. The small, seasonally open station on Washington Island was established in 1902.

=== Tourism ===
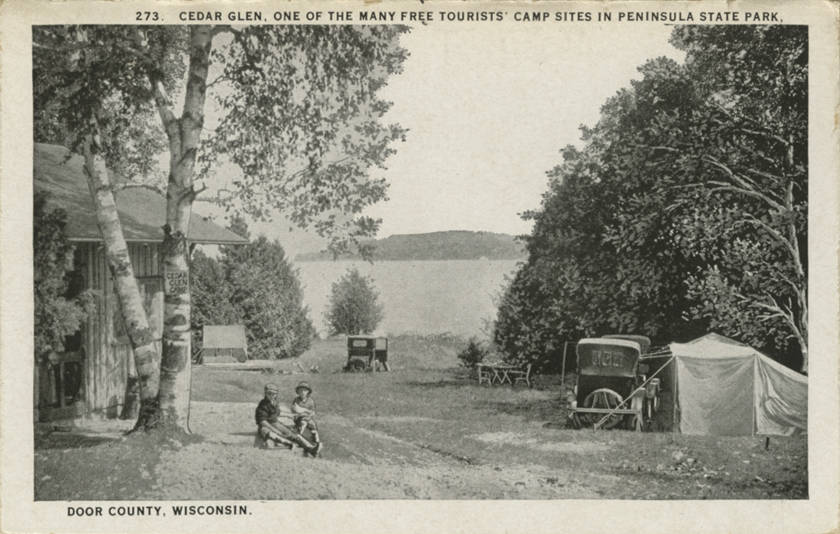
This 1924 postcard produced by Curt Teich & Company reads, "Cedar Glen, one of the many free tourists' camp sites in Peninsula State Park, Door County Wisconsin."

Even after the Ahnapee and Western extended service to Sturgeon Bay in 1894, many tourists continued taking the railroad to Menominee, Michigan (Note: See the 1899 rail map.) to embark on steamships bound for communities in Door County. This route over Green Bay bypassed poor road conditions in the northern part of the county, which persisted until the early 1920s. Only after crushed stone highways were built did motor and horse-drawn coaches become popular for transportation between Sturgeon Bay and the northern part of the peninsula. By 1909 at least 1,000 tourists visited per year, a figure which grew to about 125,000 in 1920, 1 million in 1969, 1.25 million in 1978, and 1.9 million in 1995.

In 1913, The Old Rugged Cross was first sung at the Friends Church in Sturgeon Bay as a duet by two traveling preachers.

In 2004, the county began a sister cities relationship with Jingdezhen in southeastern China.

== Geography ==
According to the U.S. Census Bureau, the county has a total area of 2,370 square miles (6,100 km^{2}), of which 482 square miles (1,250 km^{2}) is land and 1,888 square miles (4,890 km^{2}) (80%) is water. It is the largest county in Wisconsin by total area. The county has 298 miles (480 km) of shoreline.

The county covers the majority of the Door Peninsula. With the completion of the Sturgeon Bay Shipping Canal in 1881, the northern half of the peninsula became an artificial island. This canal is believed to have somehow "caused a wonderful increase in the quantity of fish" in nearby waters and also caused a reduction in the sturgeon population in the bay due to changes in the aquatic habitat. The 45th parallel north bisects the "island", and this is commemorated by Meridian County Park.

=== Climate ===
The county has a humid continental climate (classified as Dfb in Köppen) with warm summers and cold snowy winters. Data from the Peninsular Agricultural Research Station north of the city of Sturgeon Bay gives average monthly temperatures ranging from 68.7 °F (20.4 °C) in the summer down to 18.0 °F (−7.8 °C) in the winter. The moderating effects of nearby bodies of water reduce the likelihood of damaging late spring freezes. Late spring freezes are less likely to occur than in nearby areas, and when they do occur, they tend not to be as severe.

== Demographics ==
Historical population
Census	Pop.	Note	%±
1860	2,948		—
1870	4,919		66.9%
1880	11,645		136.7%
1890	15,082		29.5%
1900	17,583		16.6%
1910	18,711		6.4%
1920	19,073		1.9%
1930	18,182		−4.7%
1940	19,095		5.0%
1950	20,870		9.3%
1960	20,685		−0.9%
1970	20,106		−2.8%
1980	25,029		24.5%
1990	25,690		2.6%
2000	27,961		8.8%
2010	27,785		−0.6%
2020	30,066		8.2%
2025 (est.)	30,616	▲	1.8%
U.S. Decennial Census; 1790–1960 1900–1990; 1990–2000 2010 2020

Population structures,
1930–2010
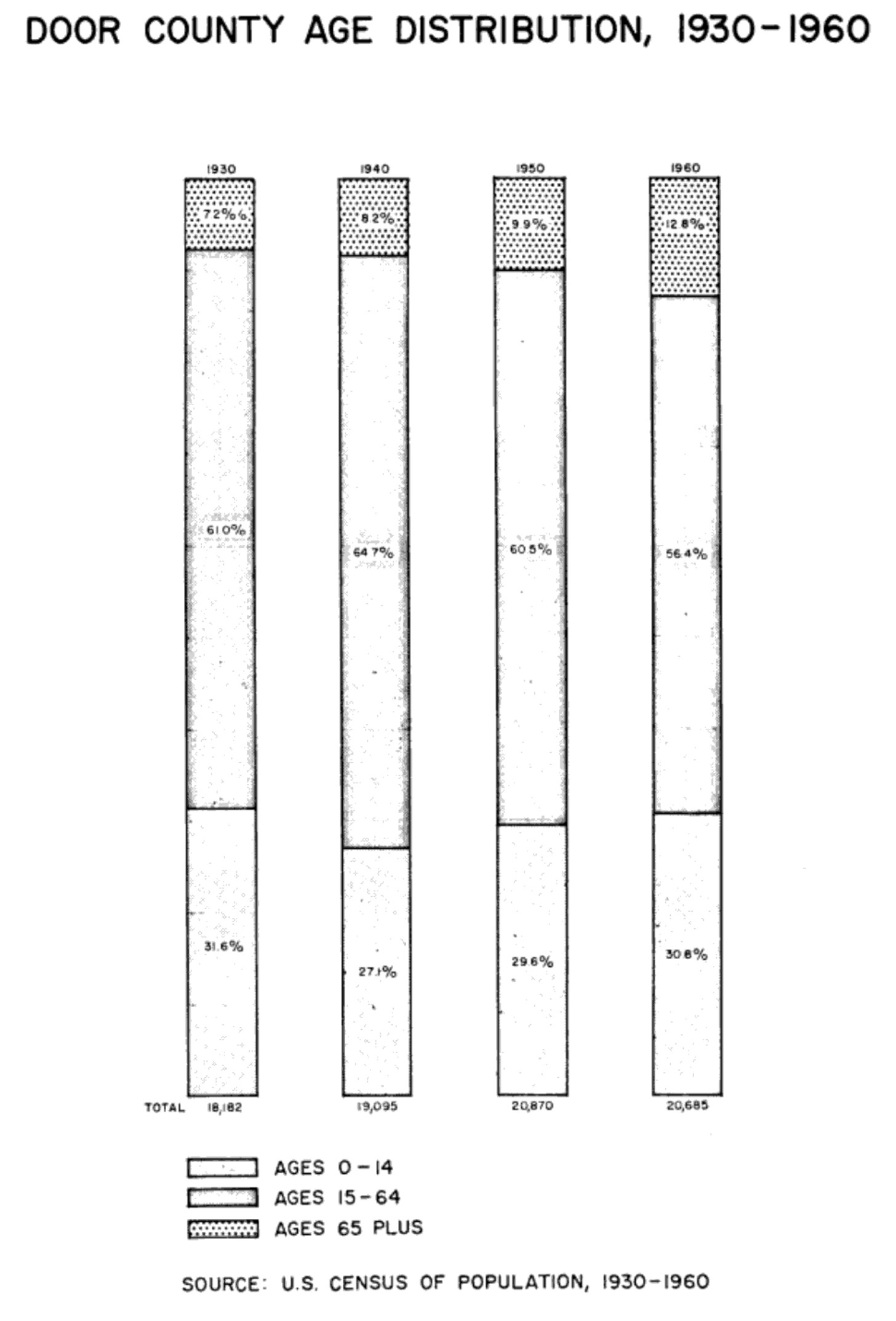

=== Racial and ethnic composition ===
Door County, Wisconsin – Racial and ethnic composition Note: the US Census treats Hispanic/Latino as an ethnic category. This table excludes Latinos from the racial categories and assigns them to a separate category. Hispanics/Latinos may be of any race.
Race / ethnicity (NH = Non-Hispanic)	Pop 1980	Pop 1990	Pop 2000	Pop 2010	Pop 2020	% 1980	% 1990	% 2000	% 2010	% 2020
White alone (NH)	24,642	25,287	27,228	26,483	27,524	98.45%	98.43%	97.38%	95.31%	91.55%
Black or African American alone (NH)	36	28	49	139	140	0.14%	0.11%	0.18%	0.50%	0.47%
Native American or Alaska Native alone (NH)	172	174	174	142	122	0.69%	0.68%	0.62%	0.51%	0.41%
Asian alone (NH)	49	47	80	112	136	0.20%	0.18%	0.29%	0.40%	0.45%
Native Hawaiian or Pacific Islander alone (NH)	x	x	3	4	0	x	x	0.01%	0.01%	0.00%
Other race alone (NH)	0	1	2	7	76	0.00%	0.00%	0.01%	0.03%	0.25%
Mixed race or Multiracial (NH)	x	x	158	227	930	x	x	0.57%	0.82%	3.09%
Hispanic or Latino (any race)	130	153	267	671	1,138	0.52%	0.60%	0.95%	2.41%	3.79%
Total	25,029	25,690	27,961	27,785	30,066	100.00%	100.00%	100.00%	100.00%	100.00%

=== 2020 census ===
As of the 2020 census, the county had a population of 30,066. The median age was 54.5 years. 15.8% of residents were under the age of 18 and 31.5% of residents were 65 years of age or older. For every 100 females there were 97.9 males, and for every 100 females age 18 and over there were 96.1 males age 18 and over.

The racial makeup of the county was 92.3% White, 0.5% Black or African American, 0.5% American Indian and Alaska Native, 0.5% Asian, <0.1% Native Hawaiian and Pacific Islander, 1.6% from some other race, and 4.6% from two or more races. Hispanic or Latino residents of any race comprised 3.8% of the population.

31.4% of residents lived in urban areas, while 68.6% lived in rural areas.

There were 13,989 households in the county, of which 18.6% had children under the age of 18 living in them. Of all households, 52.9% were married-couple households, 17.9% were households with a male householder and no spouse or partner present, and 22.9% were households with a female householder and no spouse or partner present. About 31.3% of all households were made up of individuals and 16.4% had someone living alone who was 65 years of age or older.

There were 23,738 housing units, of which 41.1% were vacant. Among occupied housing units, 77.4% were owner-occupied and 22.6% were renter-occupied. The homeowner vacancy rate was 1.3% and the rental vacancy rate was 10.5%.

=== 2000 census ===
As of the 2000 census, there were 27,961 people, 11,828 households, and 7,995 families residing in the county. The population density was 58 people per square mile (22 people/km^{2}). There were 19,587 housing units at an average density of 41 units per square mile (16 units/km^{2}). The racial makeup of the county was 97.84% White, 0.19% Black or African American, 0.65% Native American, 0.29% Asian, 0.01% Pacific Islander, 0.33% from other races, and 0.69% from two or more races. 0.95% of the population were Hispanic or Latino of any race. 39.4% were of German and 10.3% Belgian ancestry. A small pocket of Walloon speakers forms the only Walloon-language region outside of Wallonia and its immediate neighbors.

Out of a total of 11,828 households, 58.10% were married couples living together, 6.50% had a female householder with no husband present, and 32.40% were non-families. 28.10% of all households were made up of individuals, and 12.70% had someone living alone who was 65 years of age or older. The average household size was 2.33 and the average family size was 2.84.

For every 100 females there were 97.10 males. For every 100 females age 18 and over, there were 94.50 males. 22.10% of the population was under the age of 18, a decrease from 25.9% being under the age of 18 in the 1990 census.) Additionally, 6.10% were aged from 18 to 24, 25.40% from 25 to 44, and 27.70% from 45 to 64.

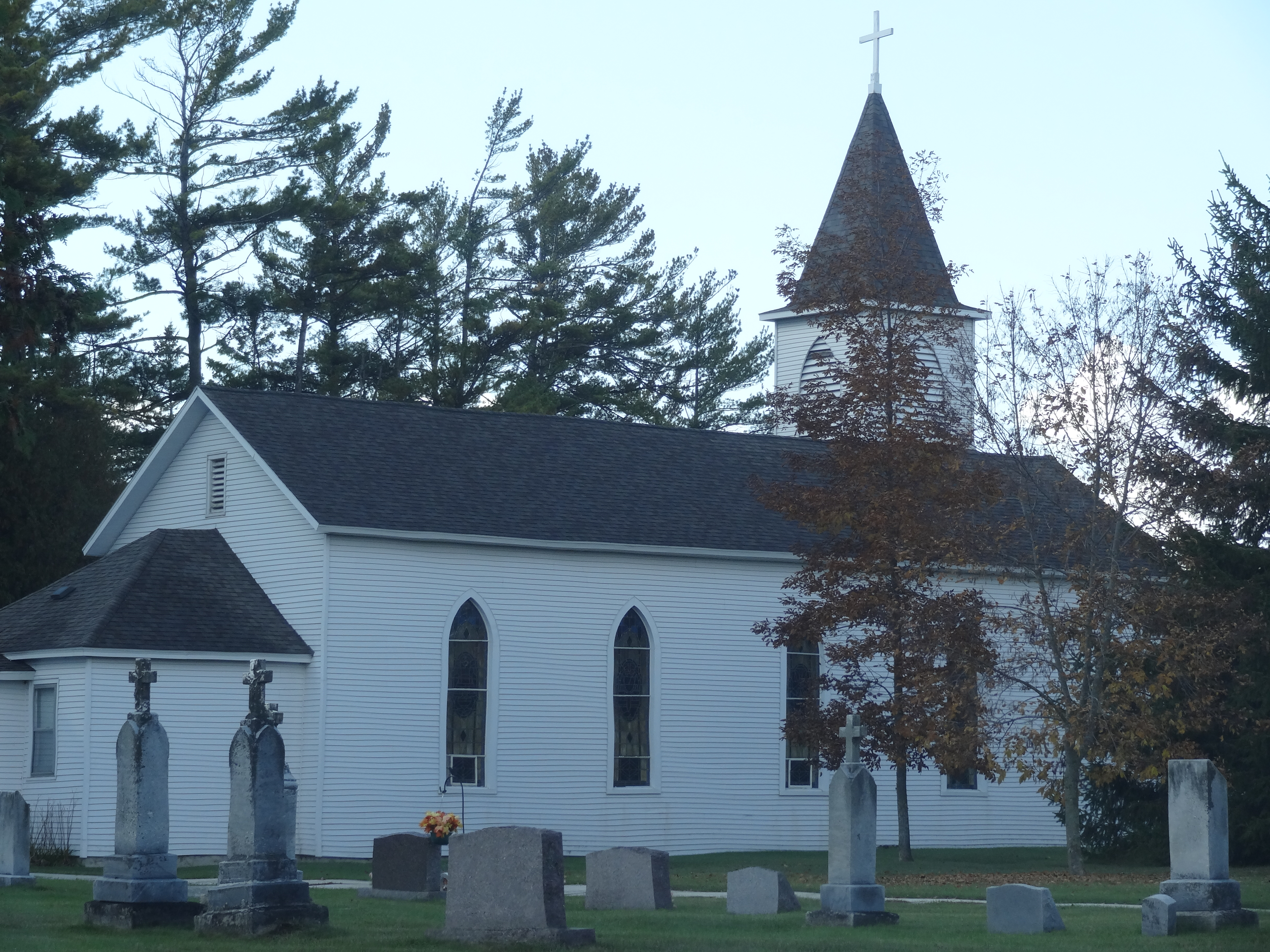
The Jacksonport site of Stella Maris Catholic Parish, a six-point parish in the northern part of the county

=== Crime ===
In 2020, there were 208 felony cases prosecuted by the county, up from 195 cases in 2019 and 171 in 2018. No trials were held concerning any of the felony cases in 2020. In 2019, 3 cases went to trial, down from 6 in 2018.

The county has been a focus of sex-trafficking enforcement efforts. From 2015 to 2020 there were no reports of sex-trafficking in the county.

In 2014, the voluntary intoxication defense in Wisconsin was repealed due to outcry following its use during a trial in Door County. Initially the trial ended with a hung jury but a retrial resulted in a conviction.

== Economy ==
Door County's economy is considered a "forestry-related tourism"-based economy. In 2020, the total gross domestic product (GDP) of the county was $1.39 billion, with the $274 million manufacturing industry overtaking real estate and rental and leasing that year to become the leading industry in the county at 19.7% of the overall GDP.

In Sturgeon Bay, industrial tourism includes tours of the Bay Shipbuilding Company, CenterPointe Yacht Services and other manufacturers.

== Arts and culture ==
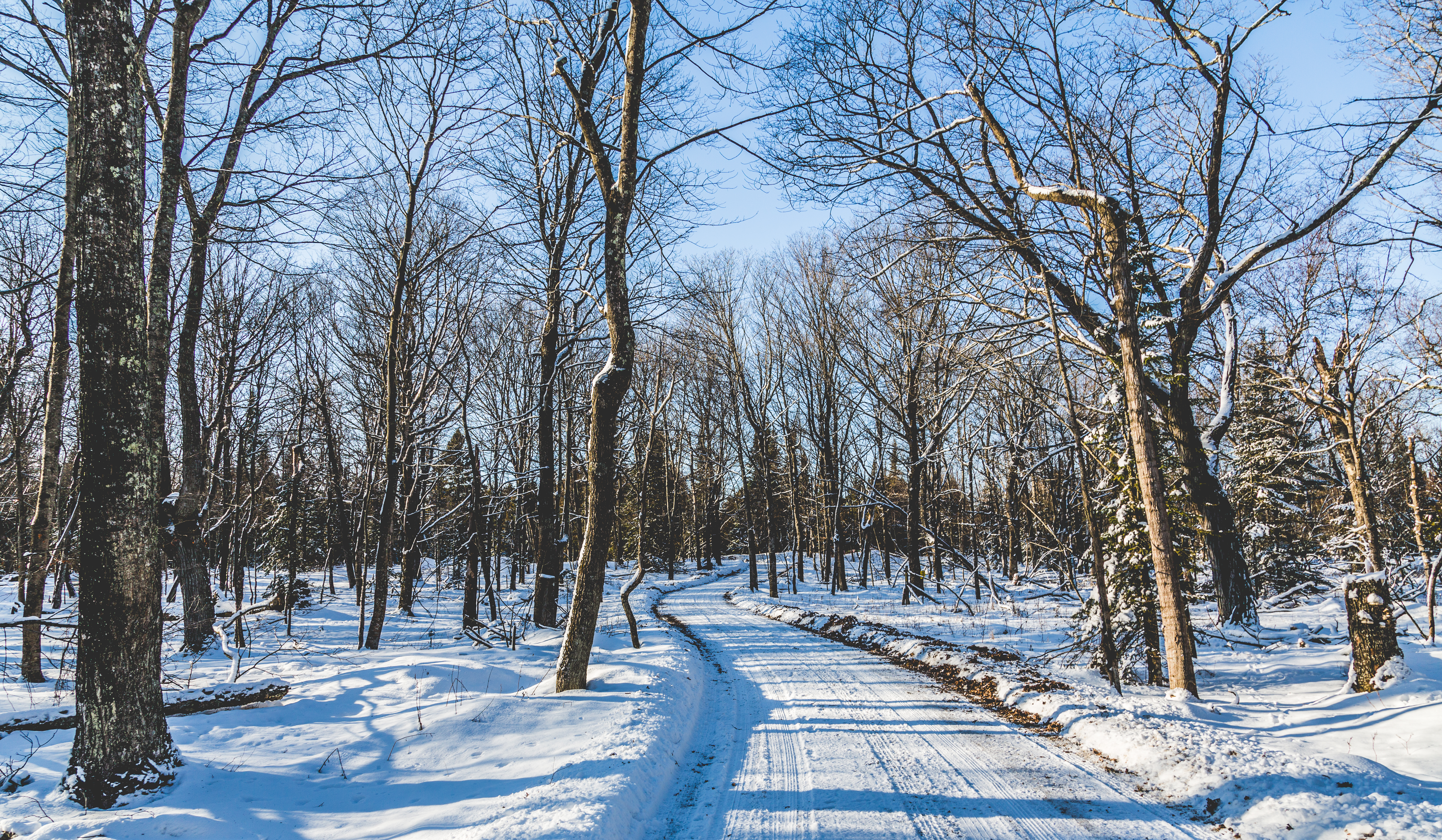
Road in Shivering Sands wetland complex, January 1

Most tourists and summer residents in Door County come from the metropolitan areas of Chicago, Madison, Milwaukee, and Minneapolis–Saint Paul. Illinois residents are the dominant group in Door County and farther south along Lake Michigan.

=== Parks and recreation ===
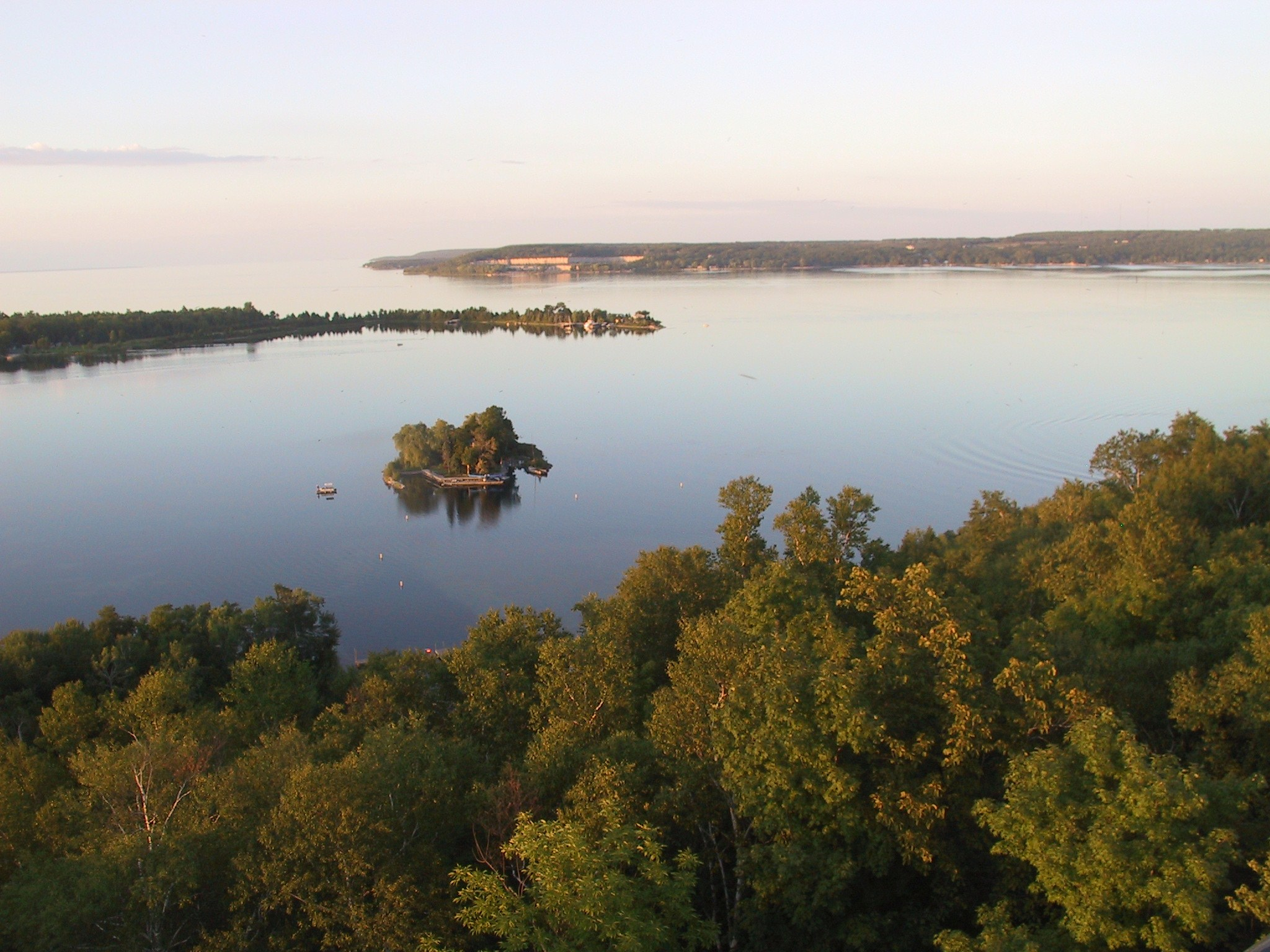
View in August from the Potawatomi State Park Observation Tower

Door County is home to six state parks: Newport State Park, Peninsula State Park, Potawatomi State Park, Whitefish Dunes State Park, Rock Island State Park, and Grand Traverse Island State Park. There are four State Wildlife and Fishery Areas (Note: Gardner Swamp Wildlife Area, Mud Lake Wildlife Area, Reibolts Creek Public Access, and Schuyler Creek State Fishery Area) and also State Natural Areas that allow free public access. (Note: Access to SNAs depends on ownership, but most are free and open to the public. Complex ownership complicates a straightforward listing of the parks, as besides the land trust, the Nature Conservancy manages five preserves in the county.) Additionally, Plum Island and Green Bay National Wildlife Refuge are seasonally open for public recreation.

Besides Lake Michigan and Green Bay, there are 26 lakes, ponds, or marshes and 37 rivers, creeks, streams, and springs in the county. The two deepest lakes, Mackaysee Lake at 26 feet (8 m) and Krause Lake at 24 feet (7 m) are on Chambers Island.

=== Flora and fauna ===
Living plant collections include the orchid project at The Ridges Sanctuary in Baileys Harbor and the U.S. Potato Genebank and a public garden in Sevastopol.

Tamias striatus doorsiensis, a subspecies of eastern chipmunk, is only found in Door, Kewaunee, Northeastern Brown, and possibly Manitowoc counties. In 1999, the Wisconsin Natural Heritage Inventory listed 24 aquatic and 21 terrestrial animals in Door County as "rare."

As of 2018, 166 species of birds have been confirmed to live in Door County, excluding birds seen which lack the habitat to nest and must only be passing through.

Kangaroo Lake State Natural Area has the largest breeding population of the endangered Hine's Emerald Dragonfly in the world. The Lake Huron locust lives on dunes in the county and is not found anywhere else in the state.

=== Lighthouses and historic sites ===
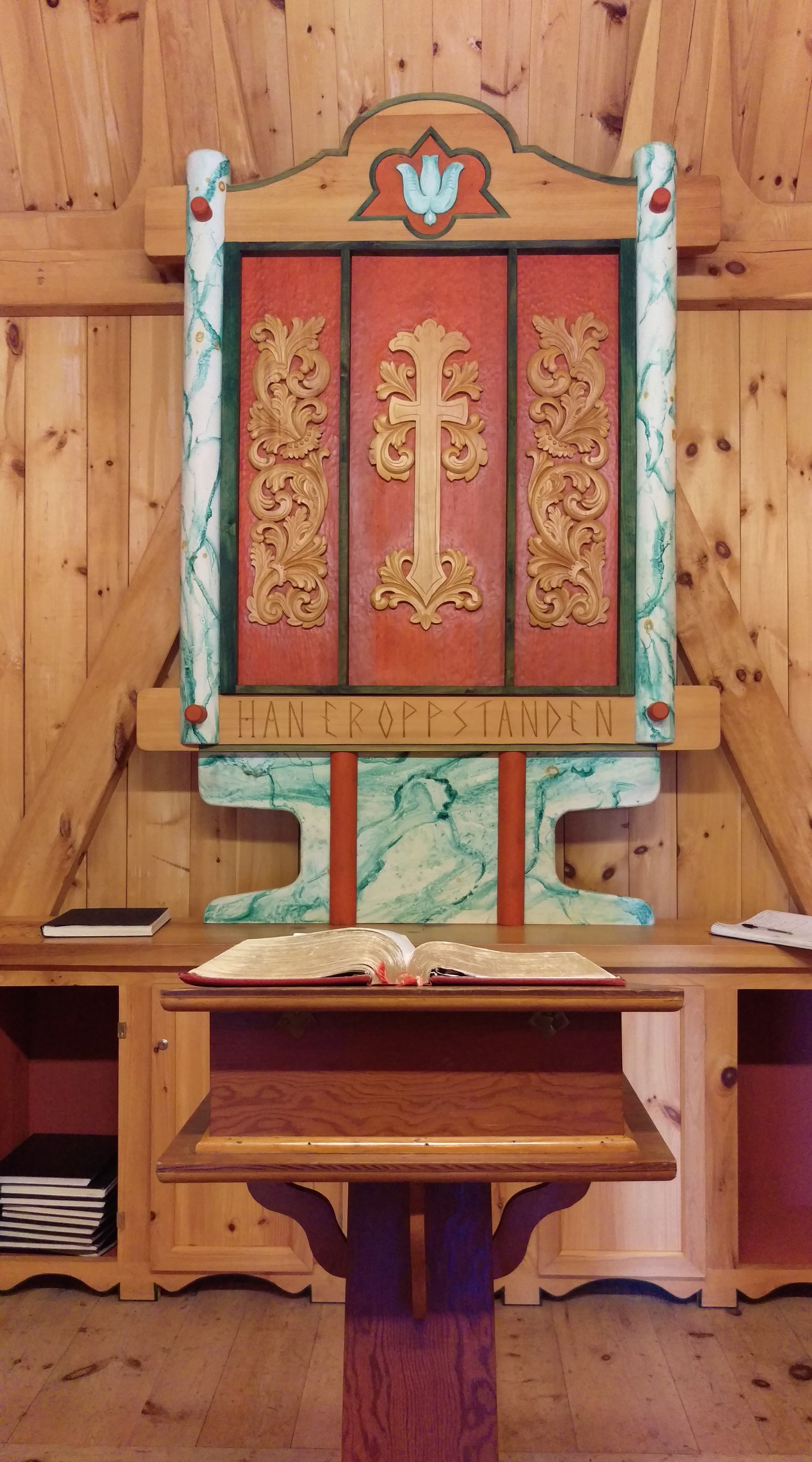
Chancel and altarpiece inside the stave church on Washington Island

Including both Lake Michigan and Green Bay shorelines, there are 50 total lights and lighthouses, besides lighted buoys. Out of these, there are 10 historically significant lighthouse structures and sets of lights still serving as navigational lights. Most of them were built during the 19th century and are listed in the National Register of Historic Places: Baileys Harbor Range Lights, Cana Island Lighthouse, Chambers Island Lighthouse, Eagle Bluff Lighthouse, Pilot Island Lighthouse, Plum Island Range Lights, Pottawatomie Lighthouse, and Sturgeon Bay Canal Lighthouse. Other functioning historic lighthouses in the county include the Sherwood Point Lighthouse and the Sturgeon Bay Canal North Pierhead Light. The Boyer Bluff Light is mounted on an 80-foot skeletal tower. In addition, the Baileys Harbor Light is a non-functioning 19th century lighthouse.

Thirteen historical sites are marked in the state maritime trail for the area in addition to nine roadside historical markers. In Sturgeon Bay, the tugboat John Purves is operated as a museum ship. Including lighthouses, the county has 72 properties and districts listed on the National Register of Historic Places. There are 214 known confirmed and unconfirmed shipwrecks listed for the county, including the SS Australasia, Christina Nilsson, Fleetwing, SS Frank O'Connor, Grape Shot, Green Bay, Hanover, Iris, SS Joys, SS Lakeland, Meridian, Ocean Wave, and Success. The SS Louisiana sank during the Great Lakes Storm of 1913. Some shipwrecks are used for wreck diving.

Scandinavian heritage-related attractions include The Clearing Folk School, two stave churches, structures in Rock Island State Park furnished with rune-inscribed furniture, and Al Johnson's Swedish Restaurant, which features goats on its grassy roof. In Ephraim, the Village Hall, the Moravian and Lutheran churches, and the Peter Peterson House are listed in the National Register of Historic Places, as is the L. A. Larson & Co. Store building in Sturgeon Bay. Although fish boils have been attributed to Scandinavian tradition, several ethnicities present on the peninsula have traditions of boiling fish. The method common in the county is similar to that of Native Americans. (Note: For a description of Belgian acculturation towards Native Americans, see The Walloon Immigrants Of Northeast Wisconsin An Examination Of Ethnic Retention by Jacqueline Tinkler, MA Thesis, UT-Arlington, May 2013, pp. 26–27 (pp. 33–34 of the pdf))

== Politics ==
United States presidential election results for Door County, Wisconsin
Year	Republican		Democratic		Third party(ies)	
Year	No.	%	No.	%	No.	%
1892	1,596	58.18%	1,007	36.71%	140	5.10%
1896	2,402	71.30%	895	26.57%	72	2.14%
1900	2,362	76.29%	674	21.77%	60	1.94%
1904	2,689	80.51%	515	15.42%	136	4.07%
1908	2,463	73.88%	778	23.34%	93	2.79%
1912	1,167	41.15%	769	27.12%	900	31.73%
1916	1,656	56.25%	1,204	40.90%	84	2.85%
1920	3,817	88.34%	385	8.91%	119	2.75%
1924	1,891	38.56%	235	4.79%	2,778	56.65%
1928	3,636	59.28%	2,456	40.04%	42	0.68%
1932	2,488	36.95%	4,149	61.61%	97	1.44%
1936	3,146	41.05%	3,952	51.57%	566	7.39%
1940	5,461	66.11%	2,750	33.29%	49	0.59%
1944	5,668	68.25%	2,599	31.29%	38	0.46%
1948	4,911	65.84%	2,440	32.71%	108	1.45%
1952	7,621	80.82%	1,790	18.98%	19	0.20%
1956	6,722	77.96%	1,859	21.56%	41	0.48%
1960	5,790	61.50%	3,610	38.35%	14	0.15%
1964	4,289	49.22%	4,416	50.68%	9	0.10%
1968	5,647	63.34%	2,728	30.60%	541	6.07%
1972	6,503	64.25%	3,430	33.89%	188	1.86%
1976	6,557	57.43%	4,553	39.88%	307	2.69%
1980	7,170	55.23%	4,961	38.21%	851	6.56%
1984	8,264	67.35%	3,916	31.91%	91	0.74%
1988	6,907	55.60%	5,425	43.67%	90	0.72%
1992	5,468	39.69%	4,735	34.37%	3,574	25.94%
1996	4,948	40.39%	5,590	45.63%	1,713	13.98%
2000	7,810	51.31%	6,560	43.10%	850	5.58%
2004	8,910	50.94%	8,367	47.84%	214	1.22%
2008	7,112	40.68%	10,142	58.02%	227	1.30%
2012	8,121	45.96%	9,357	52.95%	193	1.09%
2016	8,580	48.77%	8,014	45.55%	998	5.67%
2020	9,752	48.48%	10,044	49.93%	321	1.60%
2024	10,099	48.22%	10,565	50.44%	280	1.34%

The county has gained a reputation as a political bellwether, as it voted for the winning candidate in every presidential election from 1996 to 2020. Until 2024, Bill Clinton was the last candidate to win nationally without carrying Door County, in the 1992 presidential election. Donald Trump in the 2024 election also failed to win Door County, while winning statewide and nationally.

In 2024, Kamala Harris became the first Democratic presidential nominee to win the county while losing the presidential election. Door County was one of only four counties in the state to swing towards Democrats in 2024, and voted for a Democrat who lost statewide for the first time.

== Transportation ==
=== Land ===
According to the Wisconsin Department of Transportation (WisDOT), in 2021 Door County had 1,270 miles (2,040 km) of roadways.

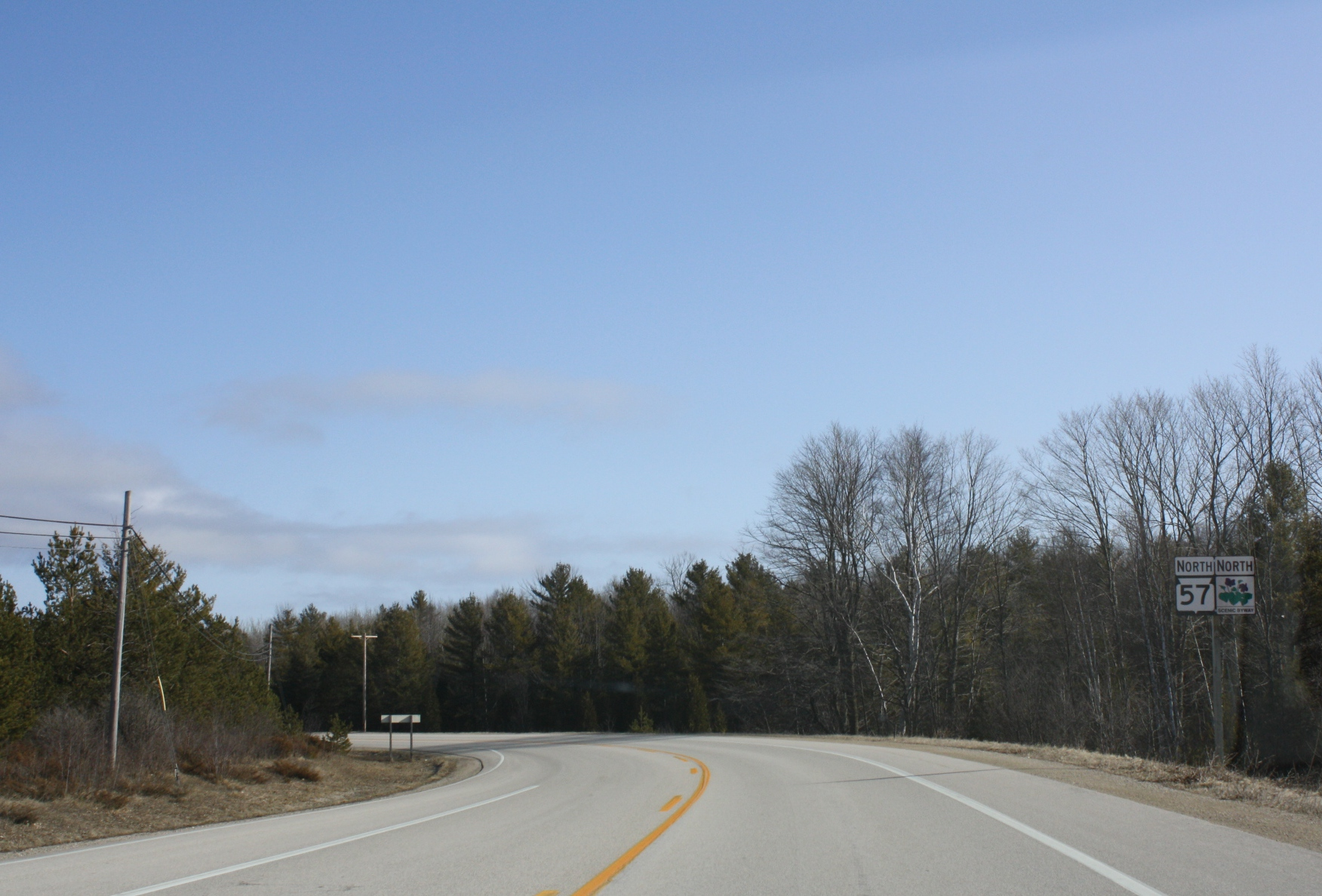
WIS 57 in March (here concurrent with the Door County National Scenic Byway)

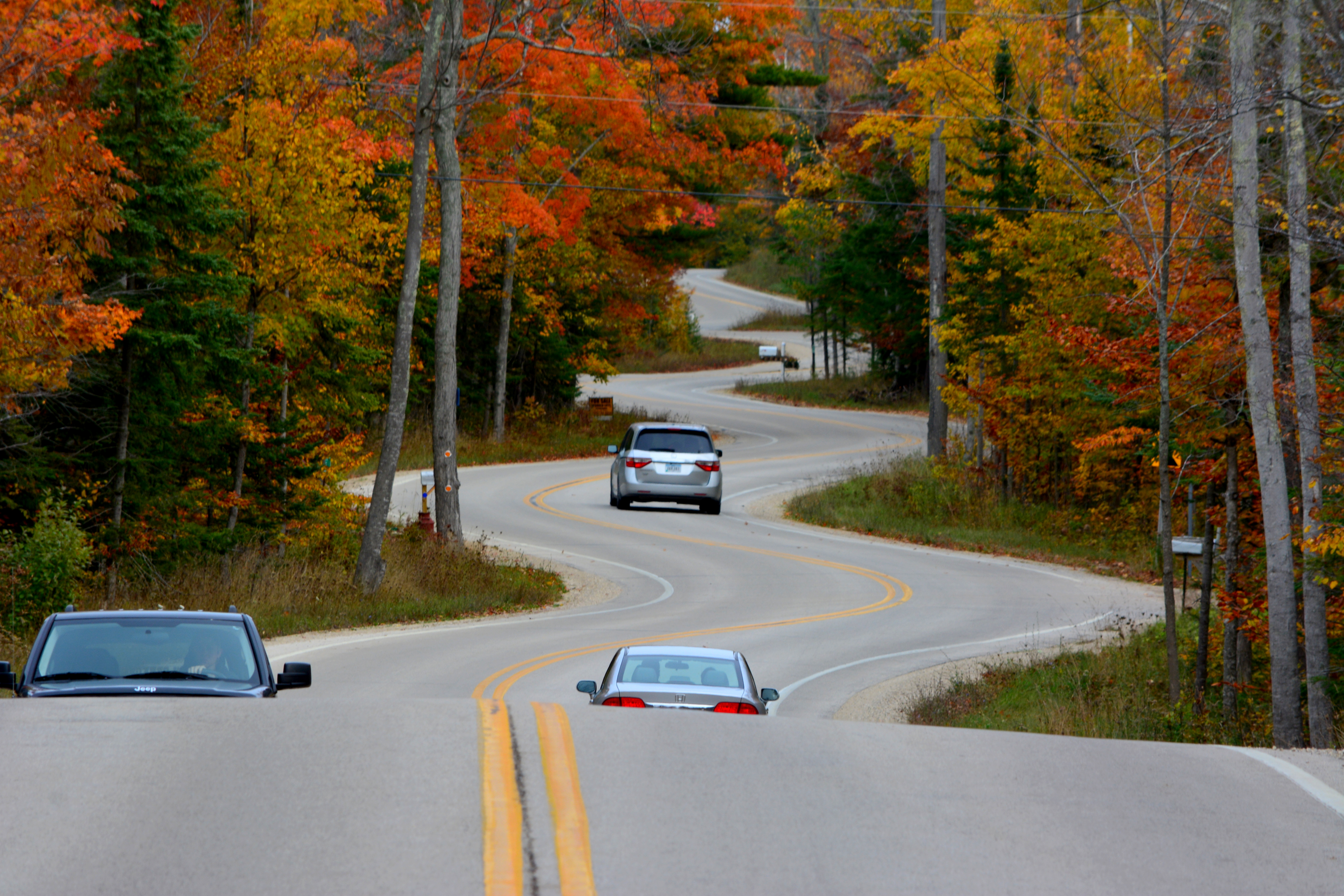
WIS 42 near Gills Rock in October

The combined WIS 42/WIS 57 separates again at a junction in Sevastapol. Following this separation, WIS 42 continues along the western side of the peninsula and sees more traffic than WIS 57, which continues along the eastern side. The two highways combine again at a junction in Liberty Grove.

- Wisconsin Highway 42 (WIS 42)
- Wisconsin Highway 57 (WIS 57)
- Door County Coastal Byway (WIS 42 and WIS 57) north of Sturgeon Bay to Northport is classified as a Wisconsin Scenic Byway and National Scenic Byway.

There are five rustic roads in the county. In addition to state-recognized rustic roads, Liberty Grove manages a heritage roads program. As of 2019 there were 12 heritage roads in the town.

There are 230.8 miles (371.4 km) of snowmobile trails, which are opened as trails are groomed.

==== Non-motorized ====
- The Ahnapee State Trail connects Sturgeon Bay to Kewaunee, winter snowmobile access is dependent on weather and trail grooming. Although the Ice Age Trail coincides with most of the Ahnapee State Trail, the Ice Age Trail forks away in the City of Sturgeon Bay and reaches its northern terminus at Potawatomi State Park. Mountain bike trails are located in three of the state parks.
- WIS 42 and WIS 57 are part of the Lake Michigan Circle Tour.
- Egg Harbor operates a free public bicycle-sharing system, limited to daylight hours within the village during the tourist season.

==== Bridges across Sturgeon Bay ====
- Sturgeon Bay Bridge (also called Michigan Street Bridge), truss structure, Scherzer-type, double-leaf, rolling-lift bascule with overhead counter-weights
- Oregon Street Bridge (reinforced concrete slab, rolling lift bascule girder with mechanical driven center locks)
- Bayview Bridge (monolithic concrete placed on structural deck with steel girder superstructure, open grating on deck, bascule)

==== Ground transportation ====
A daily private shuttle service operates between Green Bay–Austin Straubel International Airport and Sturgeon Bay. The nearest intercity bus stop with regular service is in Green Bay. There are multiple private and public ground transportation services within the county, but none with regularly scheduled stops for the general public.

=== Air ===
There are eleven airports in the county, including private or semi-public airports.

- Door County Cherryland Airport (KSUE), medium general aviation, public use
- Ephraim–Gibraltar Airport (3D2), small general aviation, public use
- Washington Island Airport (2P2), small general aviation, public use
- Crispy Cedars Airport, Brussels (7WI8), private
- Door County Memorial Hospital Heliport, allows for air ambulance service to the hospital from remote areas of the county and for flying patients to Green Bay.
- Chambers Island Airport, private
- Five other small airports (Note: The other five private airports: Forscoro Airport, Forestville; Hill Road Airport, Sister Bay; Mick Schier Field Airport, Namur; Mave's Lakeview Road Airport, Ellison Bay; Sunny Slope Runway Airport, Egg Harbor)

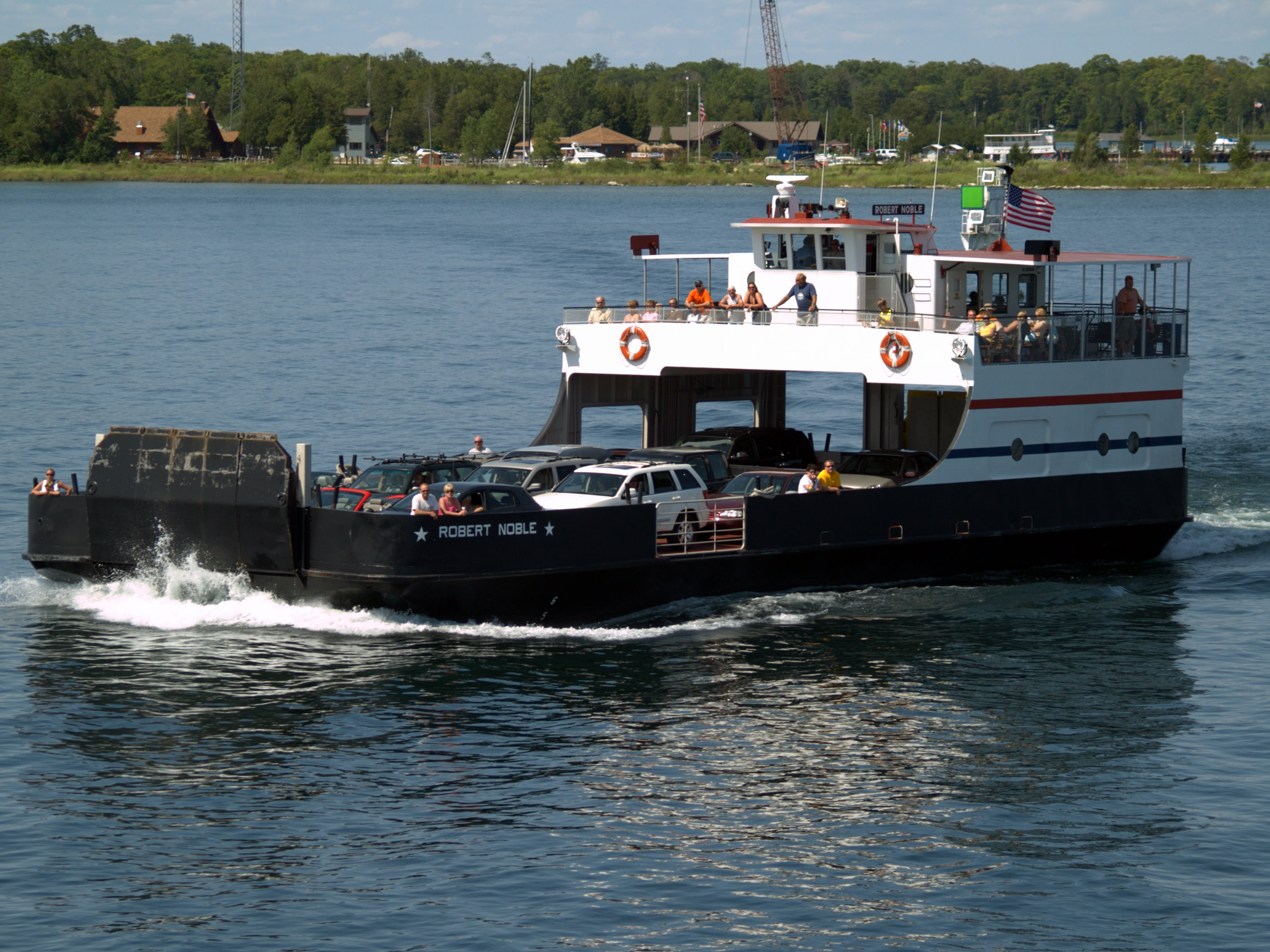
Ferry Robert Noble (Note: This ferry is named after Robert Noble, who was a shipwreck survivor and 19th century ferry operator across Sturgeon Bay.) serving Washington Island and Northport

=== Water ===
==== Ferries ====
- Washington Island is served by two ferry routes operating between the Door Peninsula and Detroit Harbor. One route is a 30-minute ride on a freight, automobile, and passenger ferry that departs from the Northport Pier at the northern terminus of WIS 42. This ferry makes approximately 225,000 trips per year. Another route is a 20- minute ride on a passenger-only ferry which departs from the unincorporated community of Gills Rock.
- Rock Island State Park is reachable by the passenger ferry Karfi from Washington Island. During winter Rock Island is potentially accessible via snowmobile and foot traffic.
- Although Chambers Island has no regularly scheduled ferry, there are boat operators which transport people to the island on call from Fish Creek.

==== Boat ramps and marinas ====
- There are 30 public boat access sites in the county. The Lake Michigan State Water Trail follows most county shorelines.

== Communities ==
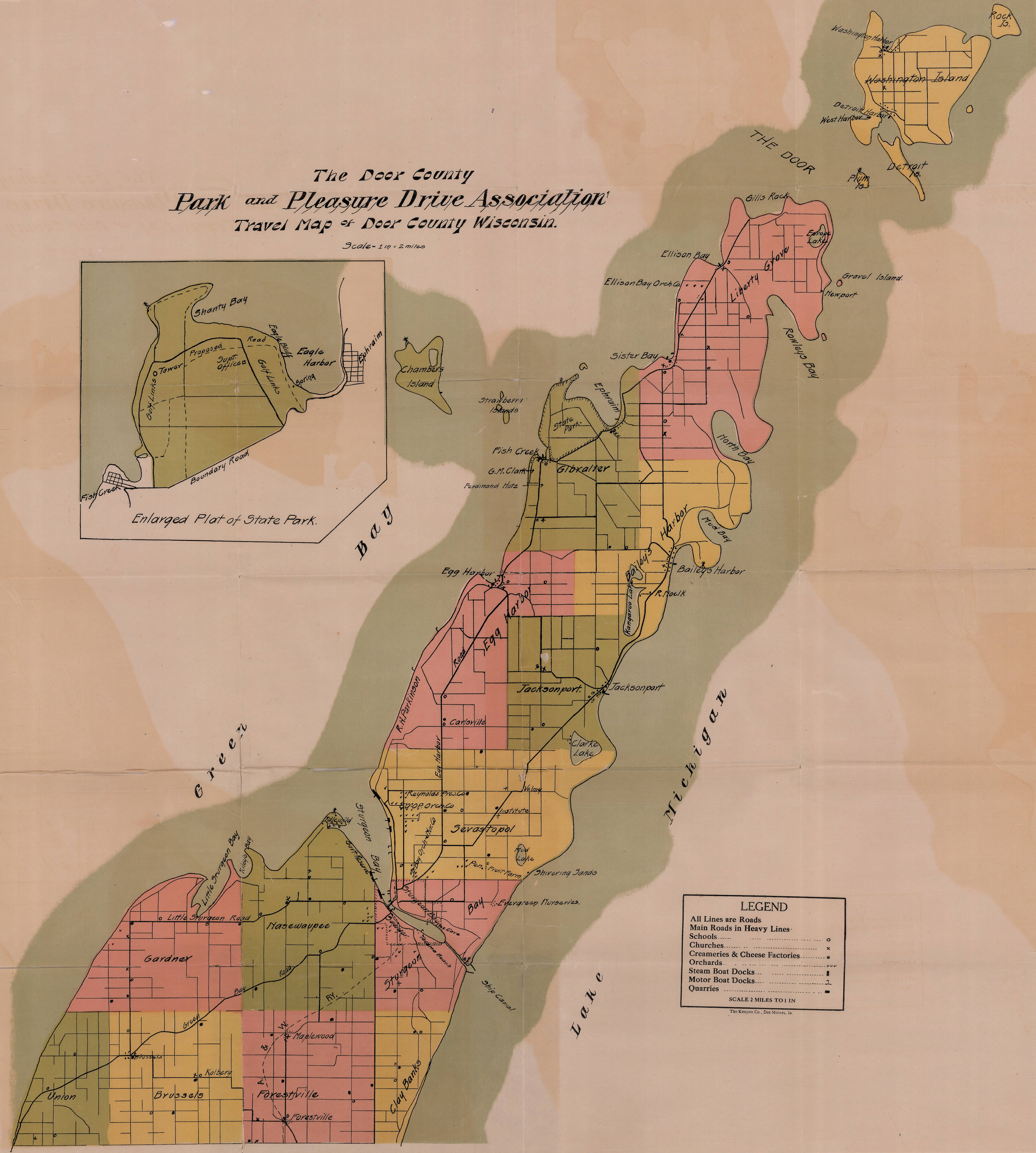
Towns in 1915; the borders remain the same today except for annexations by the City of Sturgeon Bay and the four villages.

=== City ===
- Sturgeon Bay (county seat)

=== Villages ===
- Egg Harbor
- Ephraim
- Forestville
- Sister Bay

=== Towns ===
- Baileys Harbor
- Brussels
- Clay Banks
- Egg Harbor
- Forestville
- Gardner
- Gibraltar
- Jacksonport
- Liberty Grove
- Nasewaupee
- Sevastopol
- Sturgeon Bay
- Union
- Washington Island

=== Census-designated places ===
- Baileys Harbor
- Ellison Bay
- Little Sturgeon

=== Unincorporated communities ===
- Brussels
- Carlsville
- Carnot
- Detroit Harbor
- Fish Creek
- Gills Rock
- Idlewild
- Institute
- Juddville
- Kolberg
- Maplewood
- Namur
- North Bay
- Northport
- Peninsula Center
- Rosiere (partially in Kewaunee County)
- Rowleys Bay
- Salona
- Shoemaker Point
- Valmy
- Vignes
- Washington
- West Jacksonport
- Whitefish Bay

=== Former communities ===
==== Absorbed into Sturgeon Bay ====
- Sawyer
- Stevens Hill

==== Sites used as parks ====
- Rock Island (settlement on island), now Rock Island State Park
- Newport (community), now Newport State Park
- Williamsonville, now Tornado Memorial County Park

== Adjacent counties ==
=== By land ===
- Kewaunee County – south

=== In Green Bay ===
- Brown County – southwest
- Oconto County – west
- Marinette County – northwest
- Menominee County, Michigan – northwest

=== Along the Rock Island Passage ===
- Delta County, Michigan – north; Eastern Time Zone

=== In Lake Michigan ===
- Leelanau County, Michigan – northeast and east; Eastern Time Zone
- Benzie County, Michigan – southeast; Eastern Time Zone

== Notable people ==
- Robert C. Bassett (1911–2000), U.S. presidential advisor
- Jule Berndt (1924–1997), pastor
- Norbert Blei (1935–2013), writer
- Gene Brabender (1941–1996), baseball player
- Jessie Kalmbach Chase (1879–1970), painter
- Hans Christian (born 1960), musician
- Eddie Cochems (1877–1953), "father of the forward pass"
- Erik Cordier (born 1986), baseball player
- Katherine Whitney Curtis (1897–1980), originator of synchronized swimming
- A. J. Dillon (born 1998), Green Bay Packers running back, has the key to the county
- Mary Maples Dunn (1931–2017), historian
- Phoebe Erickson (1907–2006), children's book author and illustrator
- John Fetzer (1840–1900), mill owner, Wisconsin State Senator
- Jim Flanigan (born 1971), football player
- Lou Goss (born 1987), racecar driver
- Chris Greisen (born 1976), Milwaukee Iron quarterback (AFL)
- Nick Greisen (born 1979), Denver Broncos linebacker (NFL)
- Stuart Hagmann (born 1942), film and television director
- Bernard Hahn (1860–1931), Wisconsin State Representative, hotel and opera house owner, arsonist
- Arthur G. Hansen (1925–2010), engineer, university president and chancellor
- Hjalmar Holand (1872–1963), historian
- Jens Jensen (1860–1951), landscape architect
- M. J. Jischke (born 1885), butcher, postmaster
- Al Johnson (born 1979), football player
- Ben Johnson (born 1980), football player
- Bill Jorgenson (1930 – 2007), bluegrass musician
- Al C. Kalmbach (1910–1981), publisher
- Henry Killilea (1863–1929), helped found American League
- Curly Lambeau (1898–1965), football player and coach
- James Larsin (b. 1855), saved seven people from drowning
- Doug Larson (1926–2017), newspaper writer
- Lester Leitl (1899–1980), football player and coach
- Pat MacDonald (born 1952), once part of Timbuk 3, runs Steel Bridge Songfest
- Amy McKenzie (born 1959), producer/director
- Alex Meunier (1897–1983), teacher, orchardist, Wisconsin State Senator
- Thomas J. Minar (born 1963), sex offender
- Edward S. Minor (1840–1924), U.S. Representative
- Alexander Noble (1829–1905), town official in Fish Creek
- Conrad P. Olson (1882–1952), Oregon Supreme Court justice
- Sigurd F. Olson (1899–1982), wilderness guide
- Charles L. Peterson (1927–2022), painter
- Casey Rabach (born 1977), Washington Redskins center (NFL)
- David M. Raup (1933–2015), paleontologist
- Hugh M. Raup (1901–1995), ecologist
- Dennis A. Reed (born 1822), Wisconsin State Representative, Civil War lieutenant
- Charles Reynolds (1839–1914), Wisconsin State Representative, Civil War captain
- Thomas Reynolds (1840–1919), Wisconsin State Representative, patriarch of Wisconsin political dynasty
- Jack Ritchie (1922–1983), writer of detective fiction
- Hallie H. Rowe (1896–1992), sheriff, Wisconsin State Assemblyman
- Paul J. Schlise (born 1966), U.S. Navy admiral
- John Shinners (born 1947), football player
- Paul Sills (1927–2008), director, improvisation teacher
- Allen Thiele (1940–2017), Coast Guard officer
- Chester Thordarson (1867–1945), inventor, erected buildings on Rock Island
- Emma Toft (1891–1982), resort owner
- Madeline Tourtelot (1915–2002), artist, founder of the Peninsula School of Art
- James Valcq (born 1963), writer of musicals
- Thorstein Veblen (1857–1929), economist
- Richard Warch (1939–2013), president of Lawrence University
- Lloyd Wasserbach (1921–1949), football player
- Charles Mitchell Whiteside (1854–1924), helped merge Sawyer and Sturgeon Bay
- Randy Wright (born 1961), Green Bay Packers quarterback (NFL)
- Albert Zahn (1894–1953), folk artist known as the Birdman

== Gallery ==
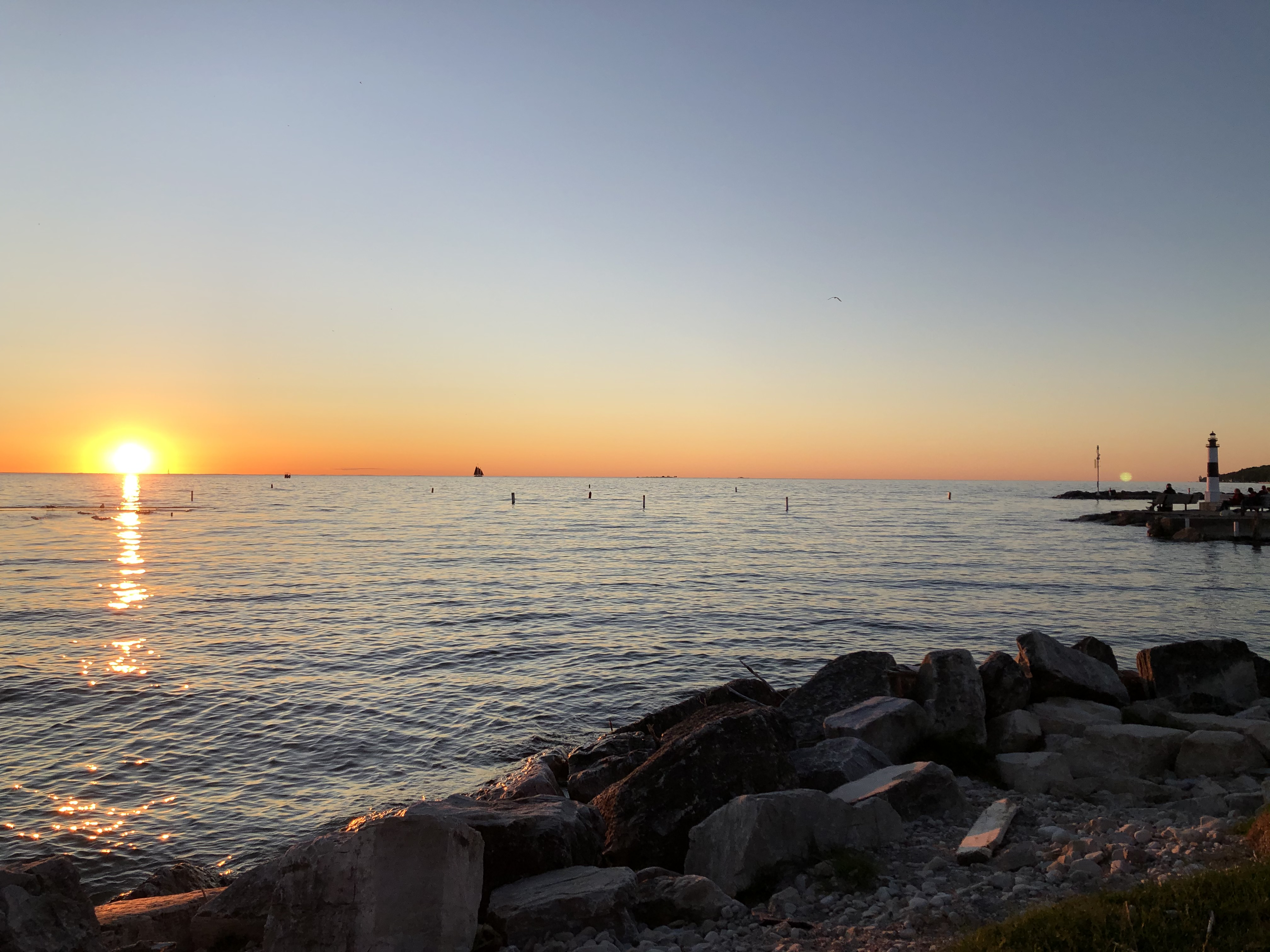
Sunset, Sister Bay

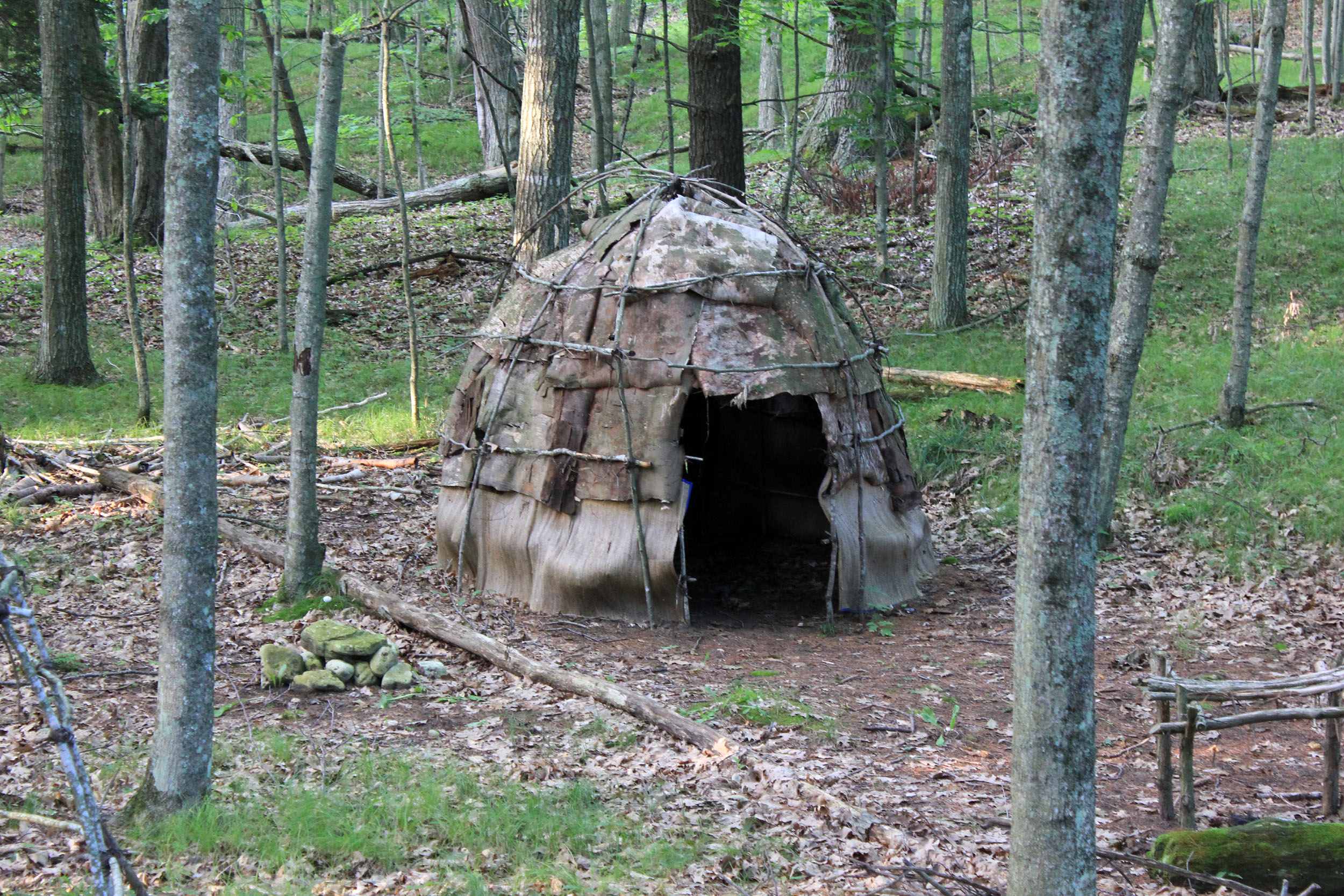
Wigwam display at Whitefish Dunes State Park

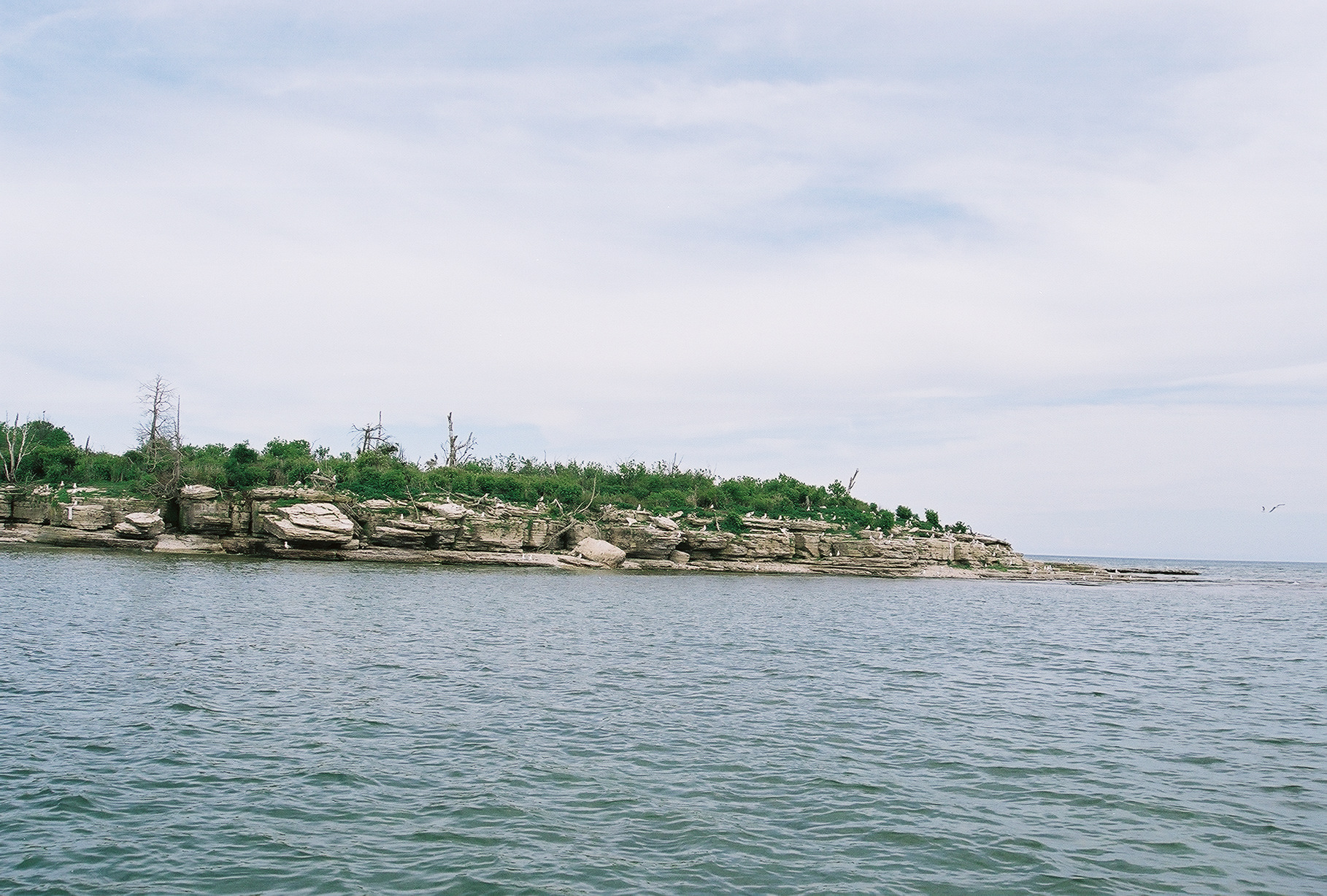
Hog Island

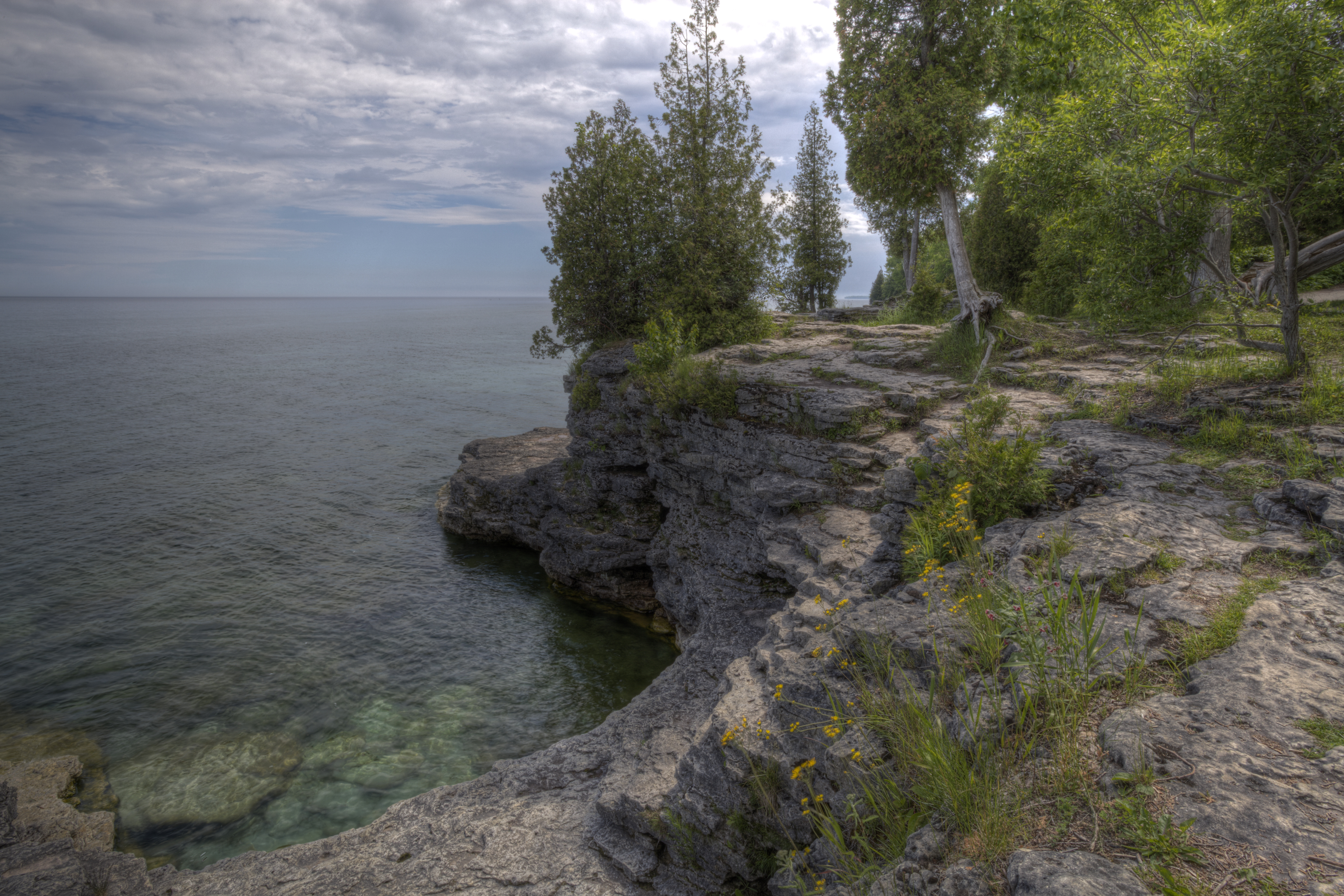
Cave Point County Park

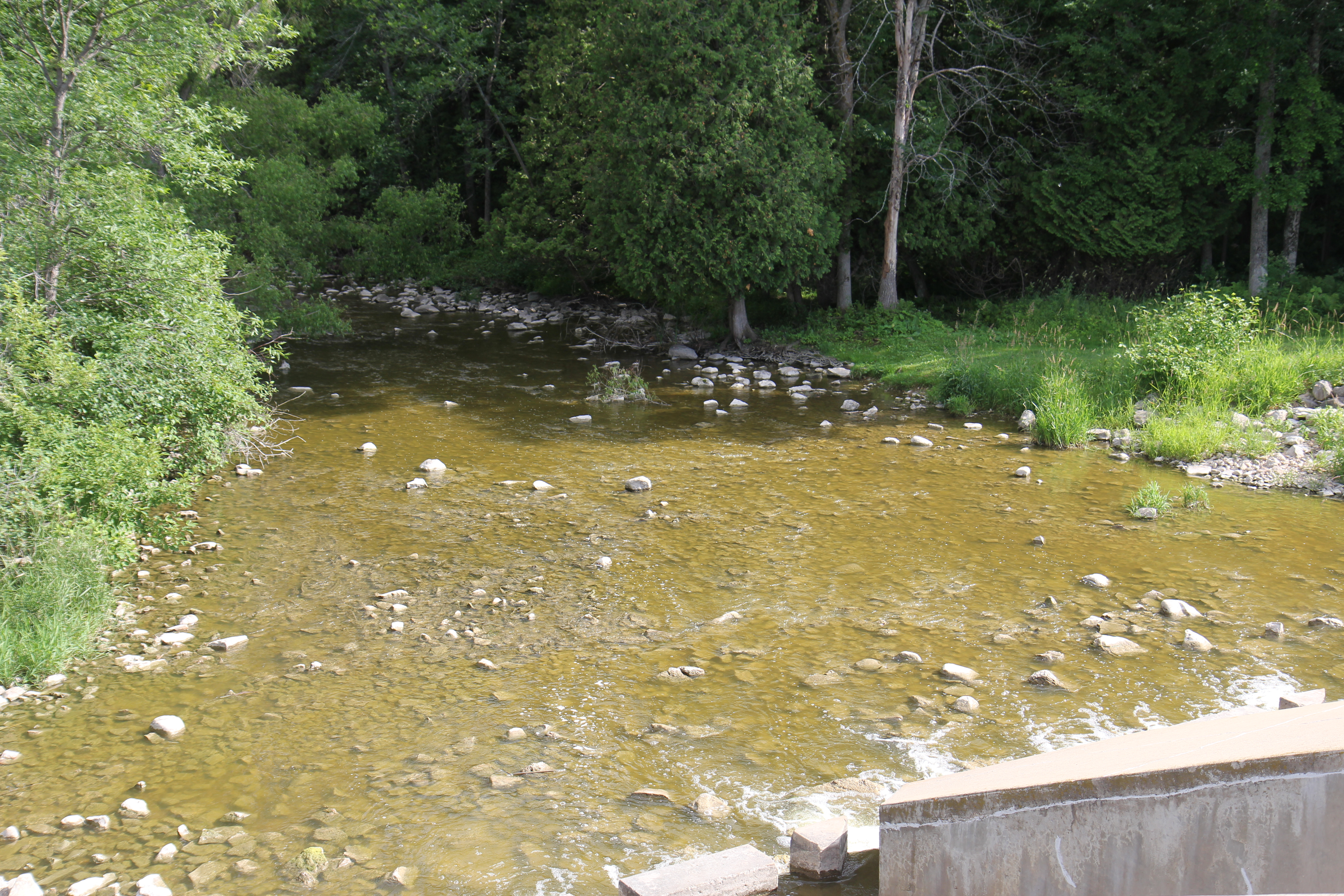
The Ahnapee River below the dam at Forestville

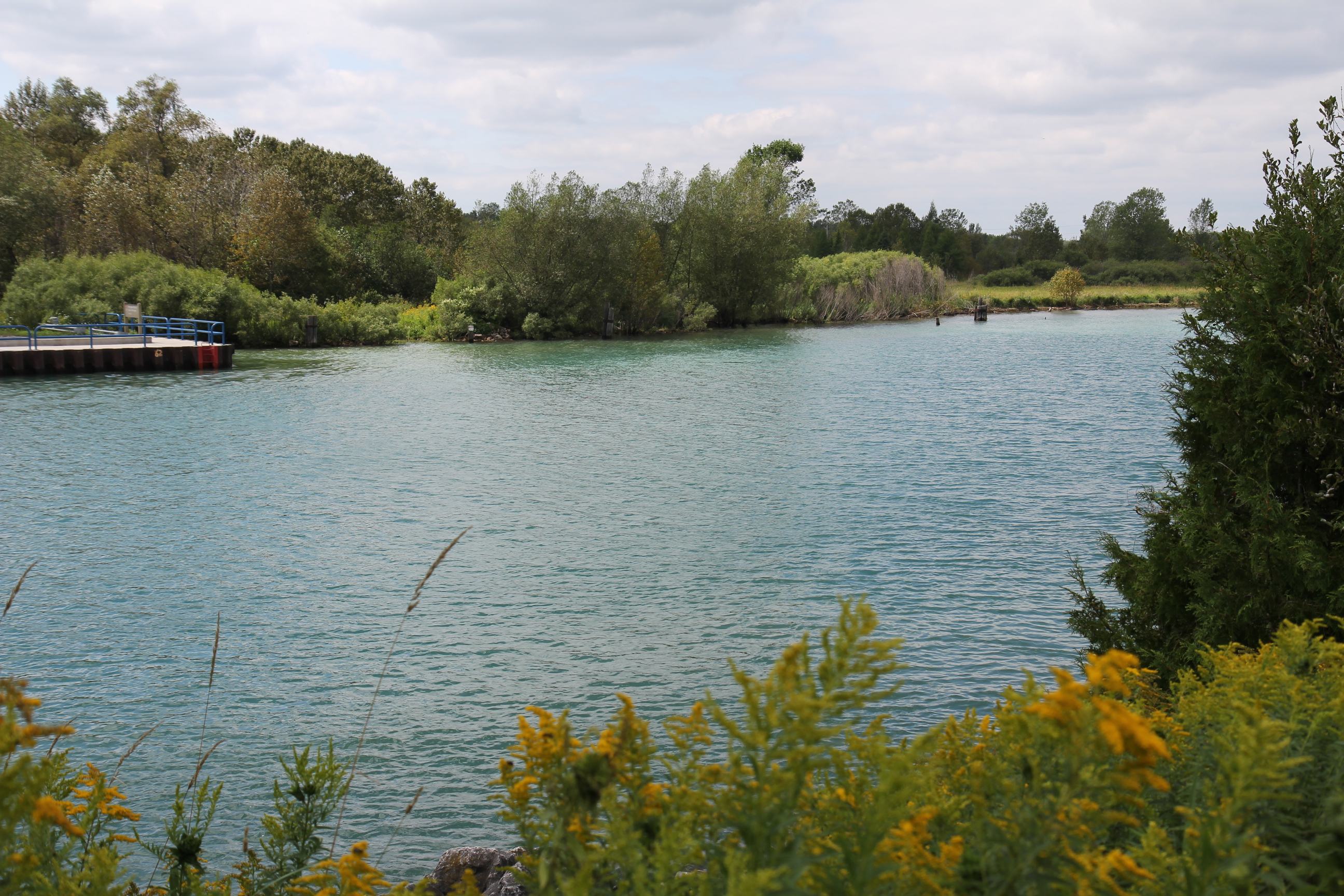
Sturgeon Bay Shipping Canal
