= Detroit Harbor =

Detroit Harbor can refer to either:

- Detroit Harbor, Wisconsin, a town in Wisconsin
- Detroit Harbor (bay), a bay in Wisconsin
