= Iris (1866 ship) =

Schooner that sank in Lake Michigan

- Iris (shipwreck)
- U.S. National Register of Historic Places
- Location within Wisconsin
- Location: Lake Michigan off the coast of Washington Island
- Coordinates: 45°24′3″N 86°51′12″W
- NRHP reference No.: 06000638
- Added to NRHP: July 19, 2006

Iris was a schooner launched at Port Huron, Michigan, in 1866. She spent 47 years sailing the Great Lakes; for most of this time she was based out of Detroit Harbor, Wisconsin. In 1913 she sank in Lake Michigan off the coast of Washington Island in Door County, Wisconsin, United States. Her crew abandoned her after she ran aground.

In 2006, the shipwreck site was added to the U.S. National Register of Historic Places.
