= Kangaroo Lake State Natural Area =

State Natural Area in Wisconsin

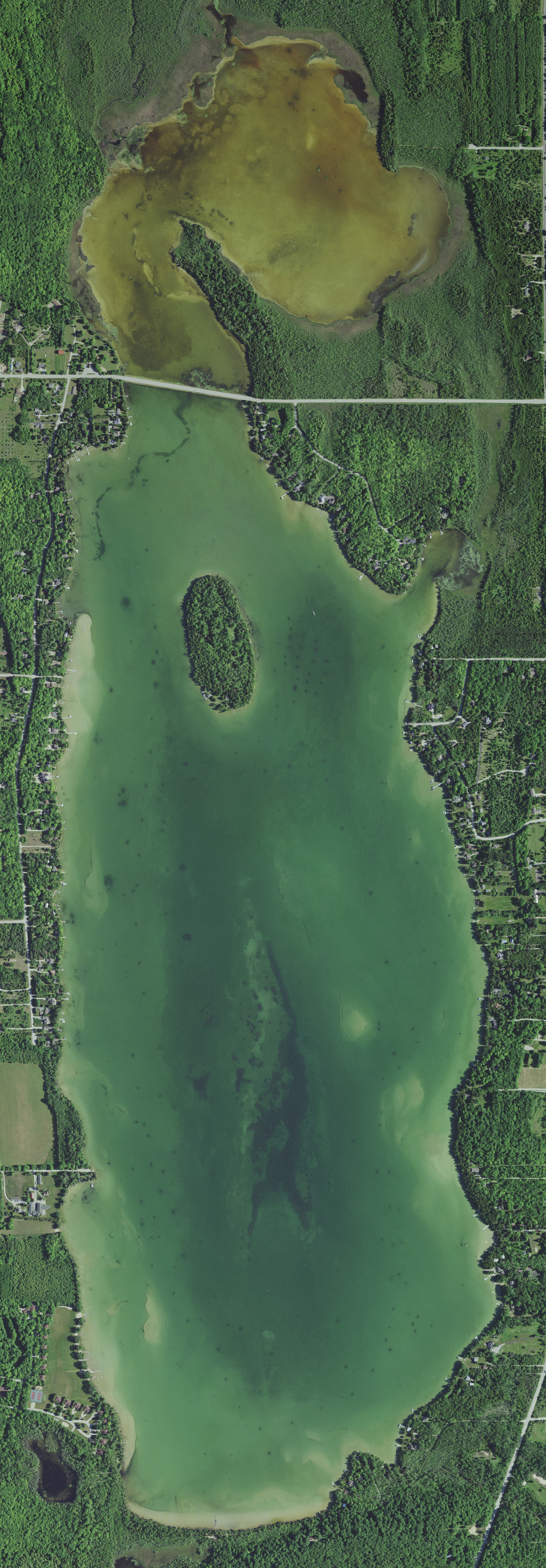
- Aerial view of Kangaroo Lake

- Location within Wisconsin Location within the United States
- Location: Door County, Wisconsin
- Coordinates: 45°3′6″N 87°9′39″W
- Area: 357 acres (144 ha)
- Elevation: 597 ft (182 m)
- Established: 2002
- Owner: The Nature Conservancy and the Door County Land Trust
- Website: Official website
- Wisconsin State Natural Areas

Kangaroo Lake State Natural Area is a nature sanctuary in Door County, Wisconsin, United States, located on and around Kangaroo Lake. The land was designated a State Natural Area in 2002. Home to the endangered Hine's emerald dragonfly, it has the largest breeding population of the dragonfly in the world. The area also provides recreational activities for the public.

== Species ==
Many species of plants, mammals, birds, and fish inhabit Kangaroo Lake State Natural Area.

=== Plants and trees ===
- White cedar
- Black ash
- Tamarack
- Balsam fir
- Speckled alder
- Willow
- Meadowsweet
- Canada yew
- Starflower
- Sugar maple
- Iris

=== Birds and mammals ===
Sources:

- Bald eagle
- Black tern
- Caspian tern
- White-tailed deer
- Canada goose

=== Insects ===
- Hine's Emerald Dragonfly
- Copper butterfly

=== Fish ===
- Bluegill
- Largemouth bass
- Northern pike
- Smallmouth bass
- Walleye

== Gallery ==
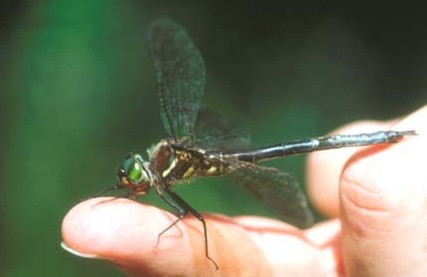
The endangered Hine's emerald dragonfly

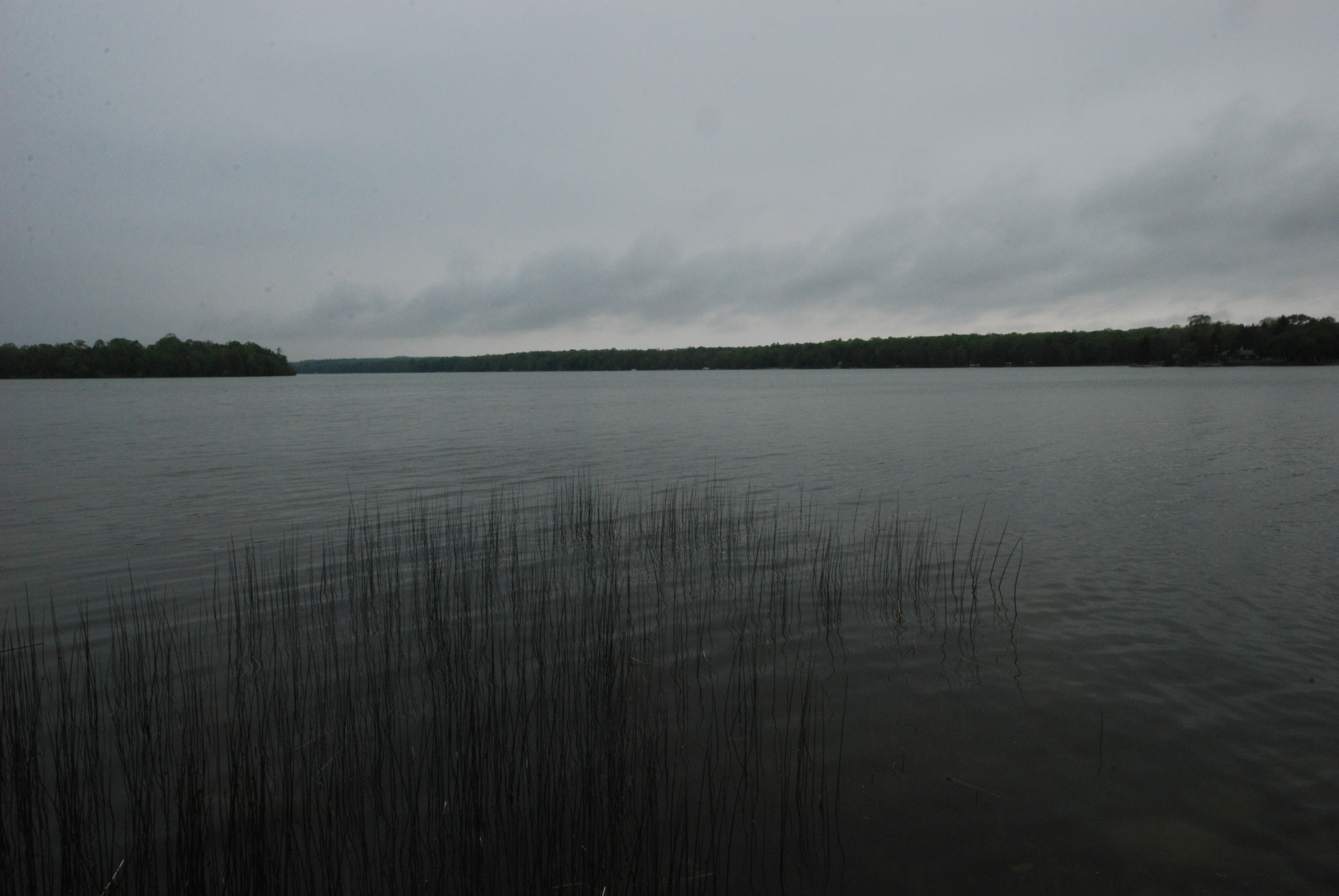
Rushes in the lake

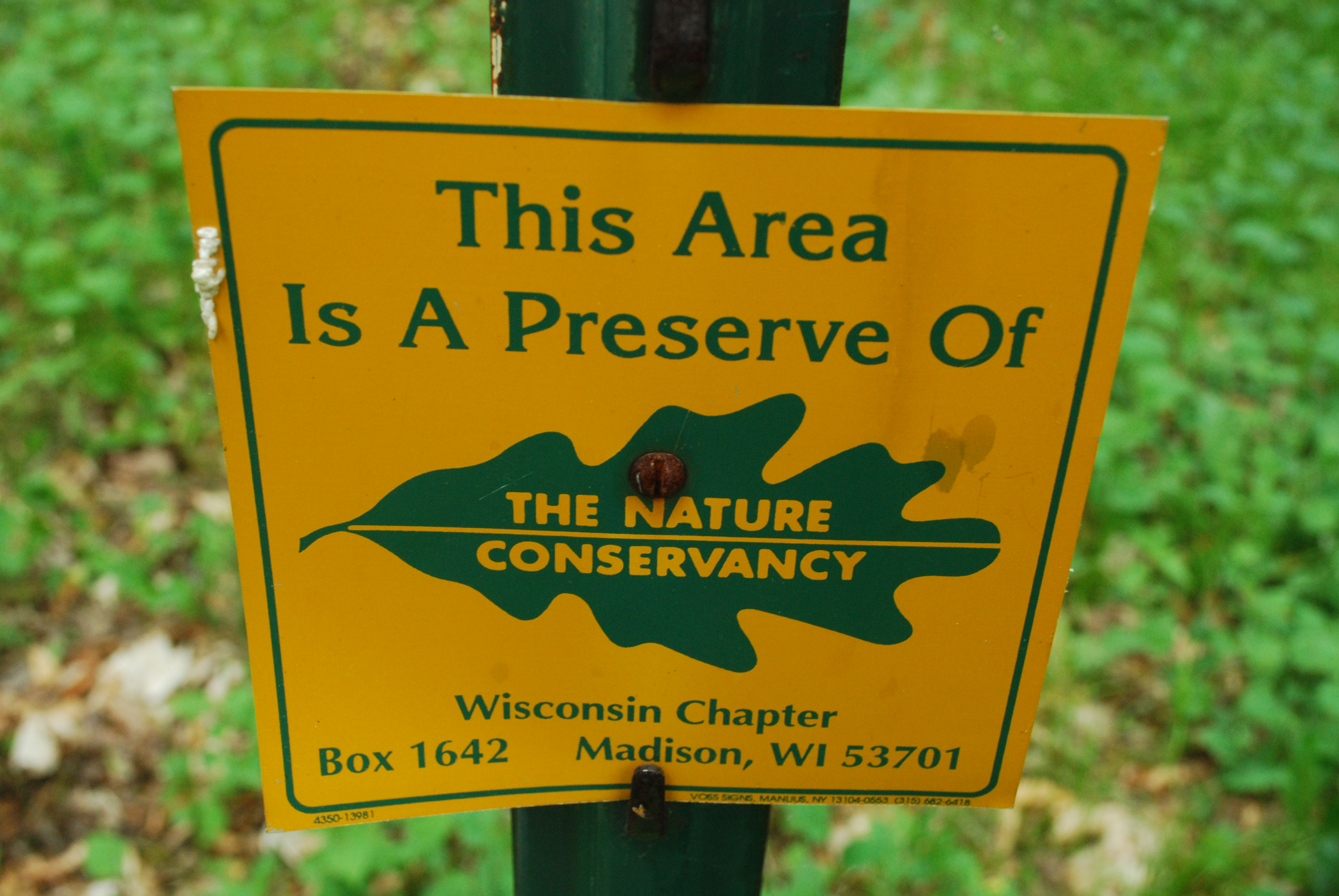
Sign

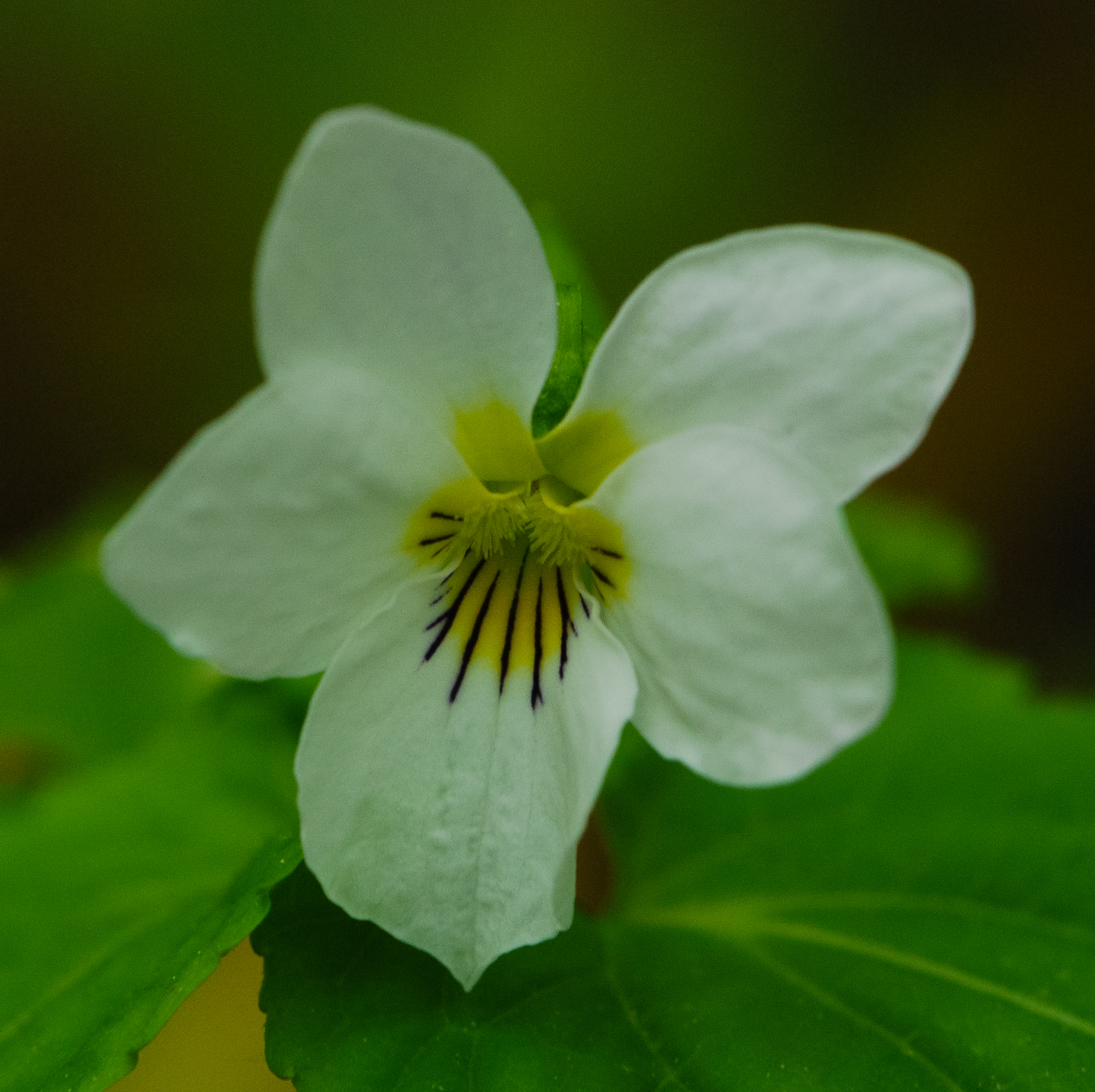
Canada violet
