= Detroit Harbor (bay) =

Bay in Door County, Wisconsin, United States of America

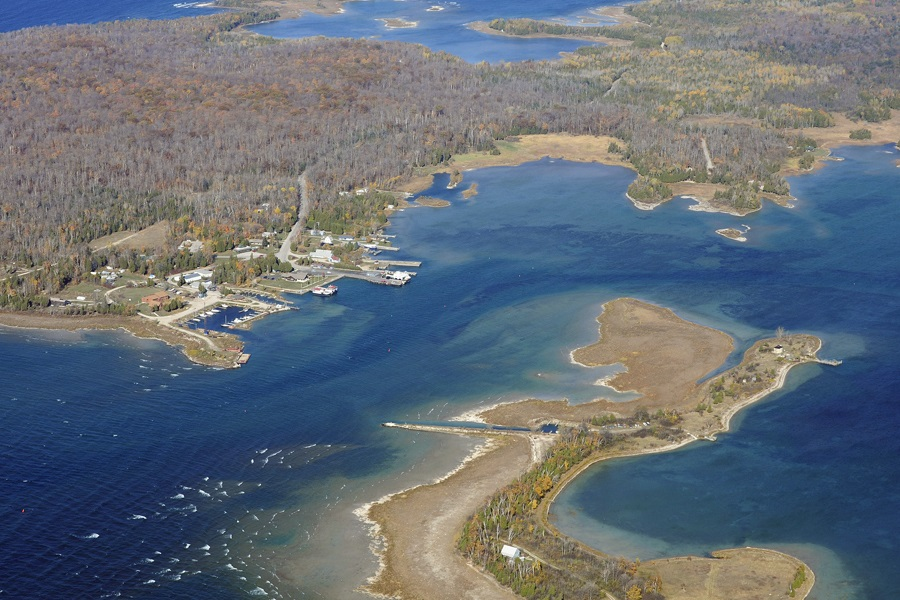

- Location within Wisconsin Location within the United States
- Location: Detroit Harbor, Door County, Wisconsin, United States
- Coordinates: 45.3466511°N 86.9240069°W
- Type: Bay
- Part of: Lake Michigan
- Basin countries: Great Lakes Basin
- Average depth: 8 feet (2.4 m)
- Max. depth: 22 feet (6.7 m)
- Surface elevation: 581 feet (177 m)
- Islands: Snake Island, Big Susie Island, Little Susie Island
- Settlements: Washington Island, Detroit Harbor

Detroit Harbor is a bay between the southern end of Washington Island, and the northern end of Detroit Island. It is located in Washington, Door County, Wisconsin. An unincorporated community also named Detroit Harbor is found on the northern side of the bay. There are three islands inside of the bay, Snake Island, Big Susie Island, and Little Susie Island. The bay is dredged on either side to allow boats through, forming the East and West channels. Both car and passenger ferries to Washington Island go through Detroit Harbor, before they dock. The United States Coast Guard maintains operations in Detroit Harbor through the Washington Island Station. Detroit Harbor is designated as a Wisconsin state natural area by the Wisconsin Department of Natural Resources.

== Climate ==
Snake Island

Climate chart (precipitation, max. and min. temperature)
J	F	M	A	M	J	J	A	S	O	N	D
66 −4 −9	60 −10 −14	62 0 −5	112 3 −1	86 9 3	77 12 10	96 18 16	73 17 15	109 16 14	119 9 7	110 6 4	66 2 1
- █ Average max. and min. temperatures in °C
- █ Precipitation totals in mm
Imperial conversion
J	F	M	A	M	J	J	A	S	O	N	D
2.6 25 16	2.4 14 7	2.4 32 23	4.4 37 30	3.4 48 37	3 54 50	3.8 64 61	2.9 63 59	4.3 61 57	4.7 48 45	4.3 43 39	2.6 36 34
- █ Average max. and min. temperatures in °F
- █ Precipitation totals in inches

== Gallery ==
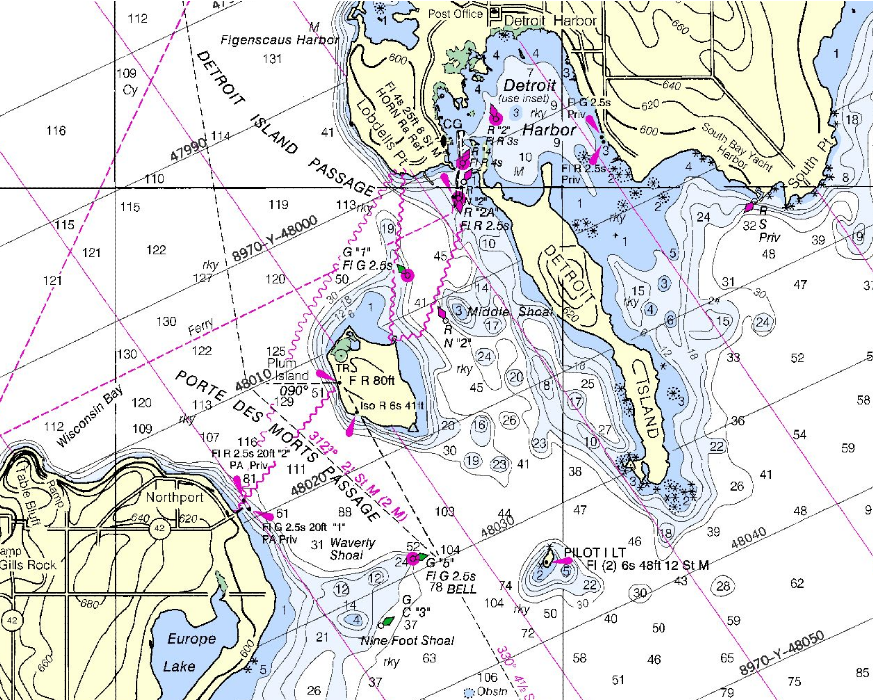
NOAA chart showing Detroit Harbor and the Porte des Morts passage

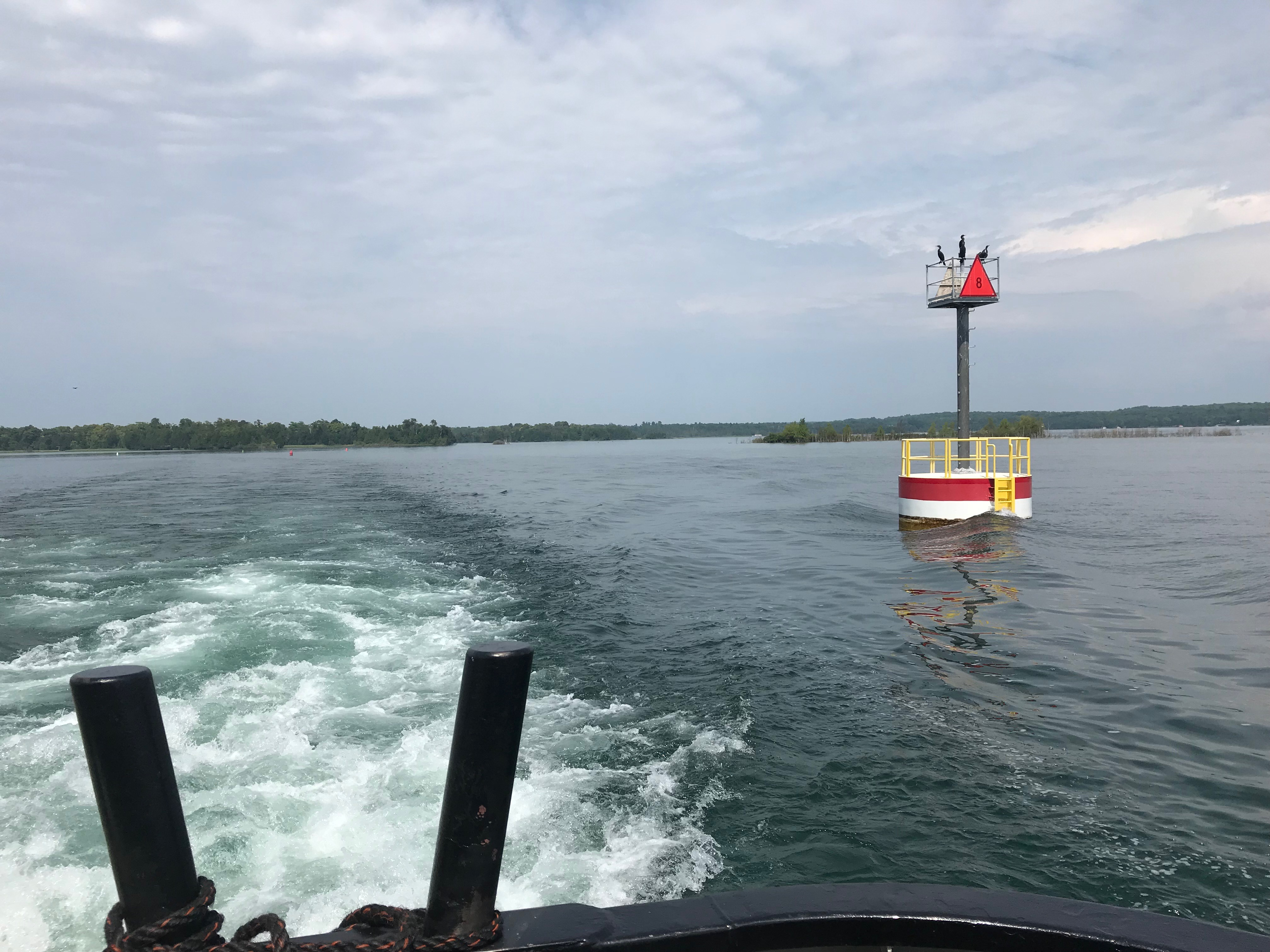
Detroit Harbor, looking west

Detroit Harbor, left
