= Shoemaker Point, Wisconsin =

- Unincorporated community
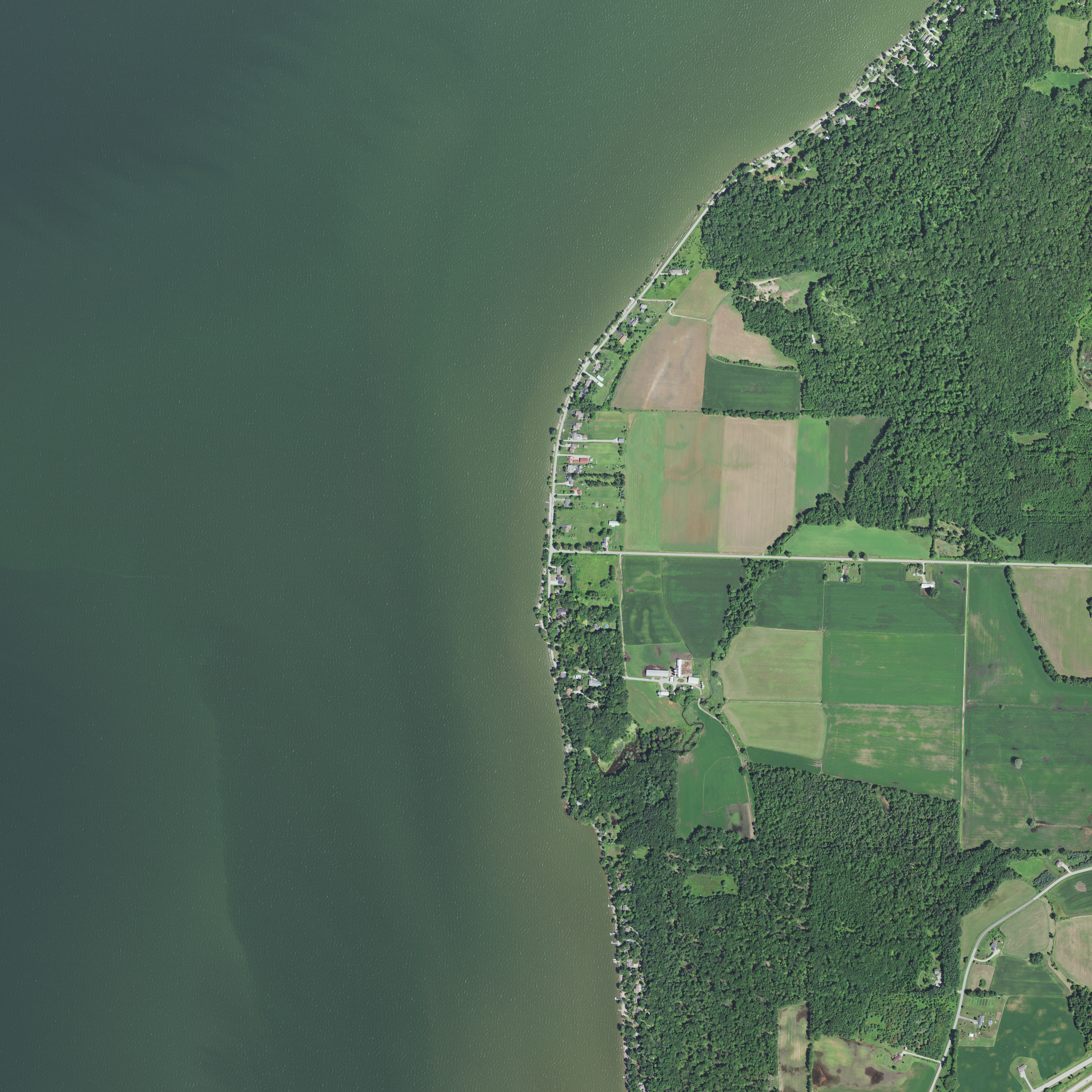
- S. Bay Shore Road runs along Green Bay, forming a T intersection with Shoemaker Road

- Location within Wisconsin Location within the United States
- Coordinates: 44°43′14″N 87°43′14″W
- Country: United States
- State: Wisconsin
- County: Door
- Town: Union
- Elevation: 591 ft (180 m)
- Time zone: UTC-6 (Central (CST))
  - Summer (DST): UTC-5 (CDT)
- Area code: 920
- GNIS feature ID: 1574066

Shoemaker Point is an unincorporated community located in the town of Union, Door County, Wisconsin, United States. Shoemaker Point is located on Green Bay, 18.5 miles (29.8 km) west-southwest of Sturgeon Bay. Named Shoemaker's point after Frank Renard who was a cobbler by trade.

== From space ==
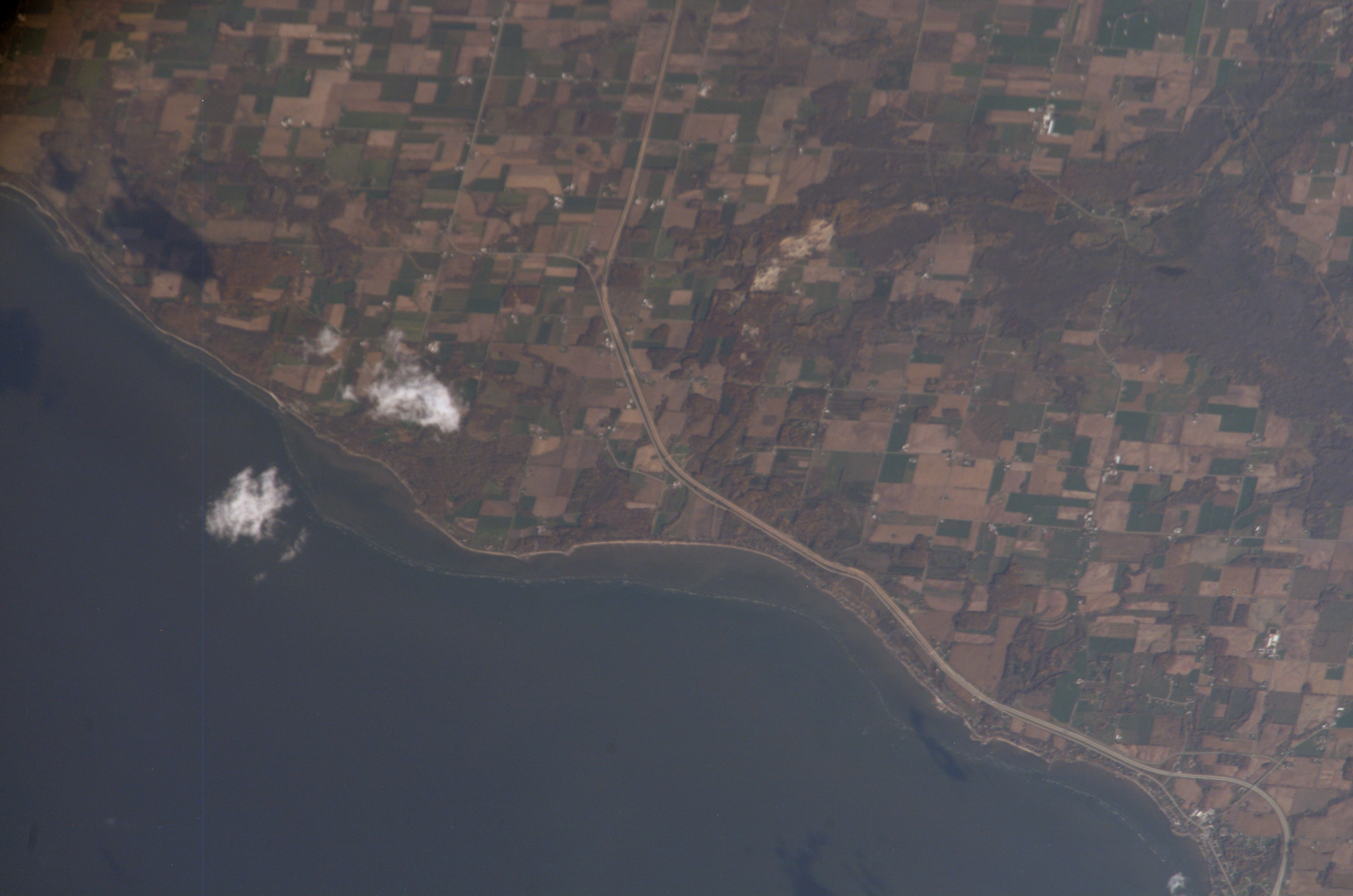
Taken a little after 3 o'clock in the afternoon CDT on October 31, 2007 from the International Space Station. Shoemaker Point is just to the right of the clouds.
