= Union, Door County, Wisconsin =

Town of Union
- Town
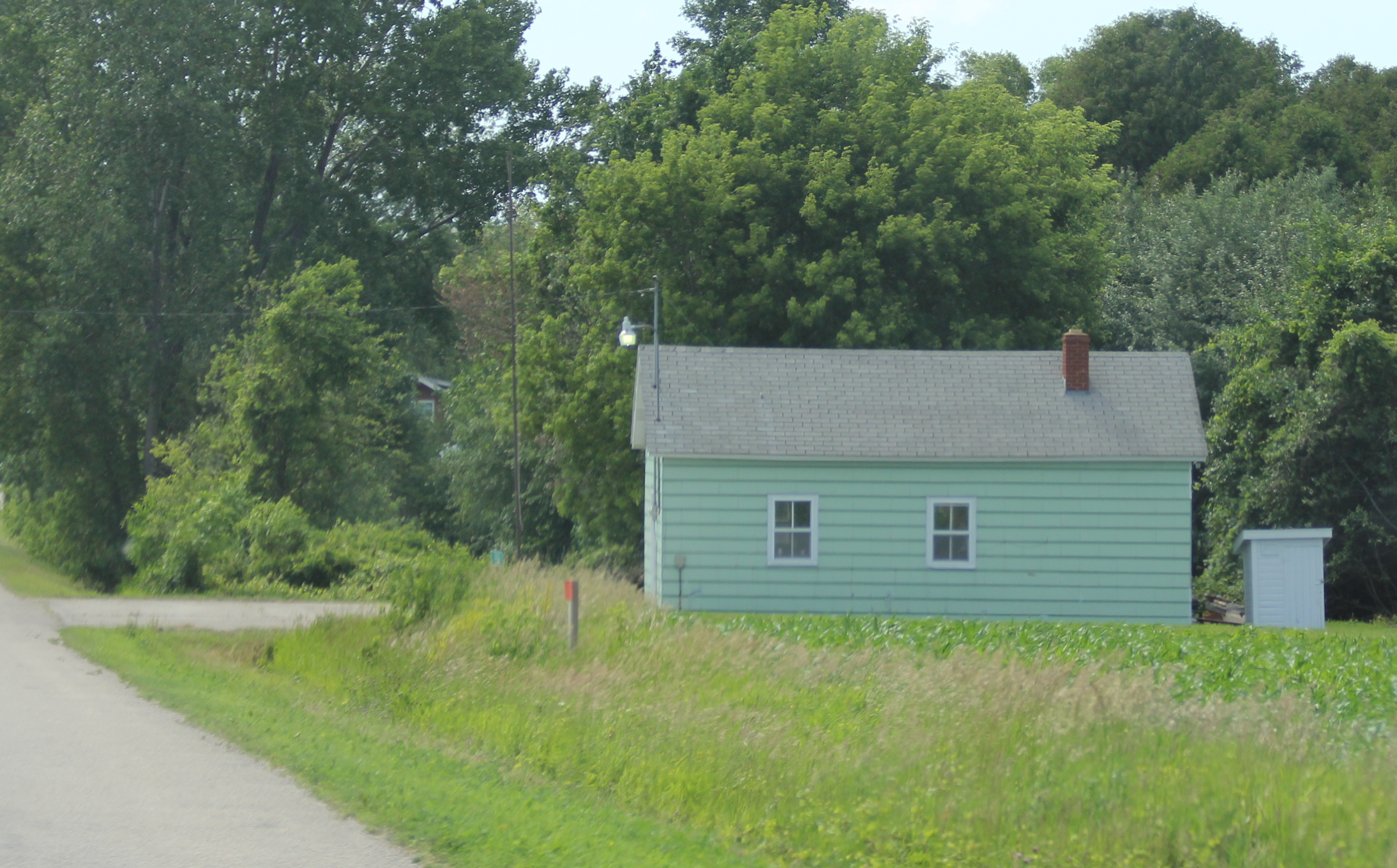
- Town hall

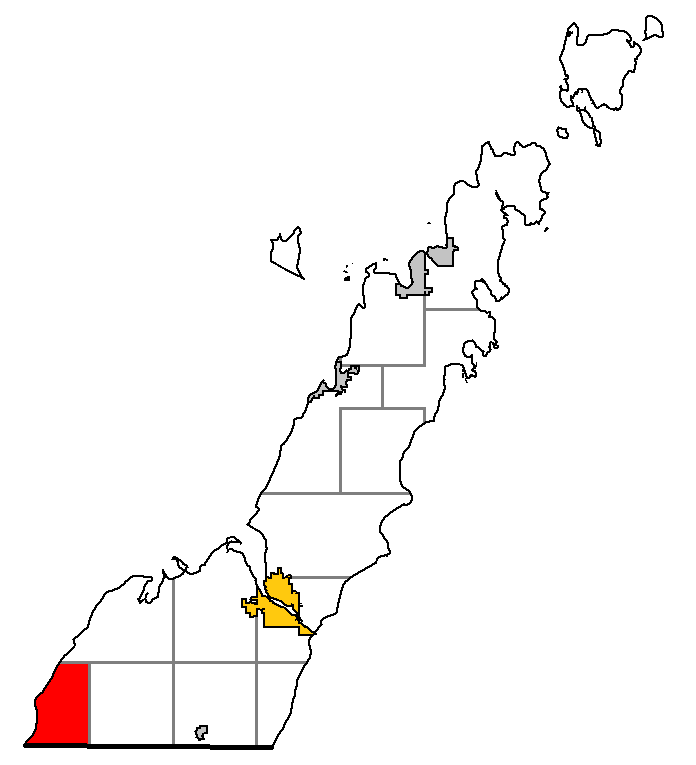
- Location of the Town of Union, within Door County
- Coordinates: 44°42′58″N 87°41′29″W
- Country: United States
- State: Wisconsin
- County: Door

Area
  - Total: 35.9 sq mi (93.0 km^{2})
  - Land: 21.2 sq mi (54.8 km^{2})
  - Water: 14.7 sq mi (38.2 km^{2})
- Elevation: 597 ft (182 m)

Population (2020)
  - Total: 1,005
  - Density: 47.5/sq mi (18.3/km^{2})
- Time zone: UTC−06:00 (Central (CST))
  - Summer (DST): UTC−05:00 (CDT)
- Area code: 920
- FIPS code: 55-81525
- GNIS feature ID: 1584310
- Website: https://townofuniondoorwi.gov/

The Town of Union is located in Door County, Wisconsin, United States. The population was 1,005 at the 2020 census. The unincorporated communities of Shoemaker Point and Namur are located in the town.

== Geography ==
Wisconsin Highway 57 passing through part of western and central Union

According to the United States Census Bureau, the town has a total area of 35.9 square miles (93.0 km^{2}), of which 21.2 square miles (54.8 km^{2}) is land and 14.7 square miles (38.2 km^{2}) (41.02%) is water.

The Heyrman I archeological site was used by Native Americans for camping and stoneworking purposes. It is located on a sandy ridge, parallel to Highway 57 to the north of Cedar Road.

The Vandermissen Brickworks was the first brickmaking site ever excavated for archeological purposes in the state.

== Demographics ==
As of the census of 2000, there were 880 people, 335 households, and 259 families residing in the town. The population density was 41.6 people per square mile (16.0/km^{2}). There were 512 housing units at an average density of 24.2 per square mile (9.3/km^{2}). The racial makeup of the town was 99.20% White, 0.34% African American, 0.23% Asian, and 0.23% from two or more races. Hispanic or Latino of any race were 0.45% of the population.

There were 335 households, out of which 31.9% had children under the age of 18 living with them, 69.0% were married couples living together, 5.4% had a female householder with no husband present, and 22.4% were non-families. 17.9% of all households were made up of individuals, and 6.6% had someone living alone who was 65 years of age or older. The average household size was 2.63 and the average family size was 3.00.

In the town, the population was spread out, with 26.1% under the age of 18, 6.8% from 18 to 24, 27.6% from 25 to 44, 27.0% from 45 to 64, and 12.4% who were 65 years of age or older. The median age was 38 years. For every 100 females, there were 102.8 males. For every 100 females age 18 and over, there were 105.7 males.

The median income for a household in the town was $47,604, and the median income for a family was $51,917. Males had a median income of $32,250 versus $21,875 for females. The per capita income for the town was $19,372. About 4.1% of families and 5.1% of the population were below the poverty line, including 2.4% of those under age 18 and 7.0% of those age 65 or over.

== History ==
In 1865 a portion of the Town of Brussels, was set off, under the name of the Town of Union. The people in the Town of Union have, as a general thing, been united in their public matters, and have "pulled together" hence the petitioners considered "Union" an appropriate name for the town.

Chaudoir's Dock was an important shipping and working dock within the town. The state authorized the Chaudoir brothers to build and maintain a dock and pier into the bay in 1874. In 1944 the dock was sold to the county in the interest in keeping the dock open to the public.

=== Most Belgian American towns ===
The Town of Union, Door County, Wisconsin is the most Belgian American community in the United States, by proportion of residents.

1. Town of Union, (Door County), Wisconsin: 49%
2. Town of Red River, (Kewaunee County): 47%
3. Town of Brussels, (Door County): 36.4% (composed of "Brussels community" & "Namur Community")
4. Town of Lincoln, (Kewaunee County) 35.4%
5. Town of Green Bay, (Brown County) 31.8%

== Climate ==
Chaudoirs Dock County Park

Climate chart (precipitation, max. and min. temperature)
| J | F | M | A | M | J | J | A | S | O | N | D |
| 55 −7 −13 | 56 −8 −14 | 62 0 −7 | 115 13 −1 | 94 18 6 | 108 24 12 | 113 26 16 | 97 24 13 | 93 21 12 | 119 13 4 | 79 3 −3 | 56 −6 −11 |
- █ Average max. and min. temperatures in °C
- █ Precipitation totals in mm
Imperial conversion
| J | F | M | A | M | J | J | A | S | O | N | D |
| 2.2 19 9 | 2.2 18 7 | 2.4 32 19 | 4.5 55 30 | 3.7 64 43 | 4.3 75 54 | 4.4 79 61 | 3.8 75 55 | 3.7 70 54 | 4.7 55 39 | 3.1 37 27 | 2.2 21 12 |
- █ Average max. and min. temperatures in °F
- █ Precipitation totals in inches
