= Ocean Wave (shipwreck) =

Scow schooner that sank in Lake Michigan

- U.S. National Register of Historic Places
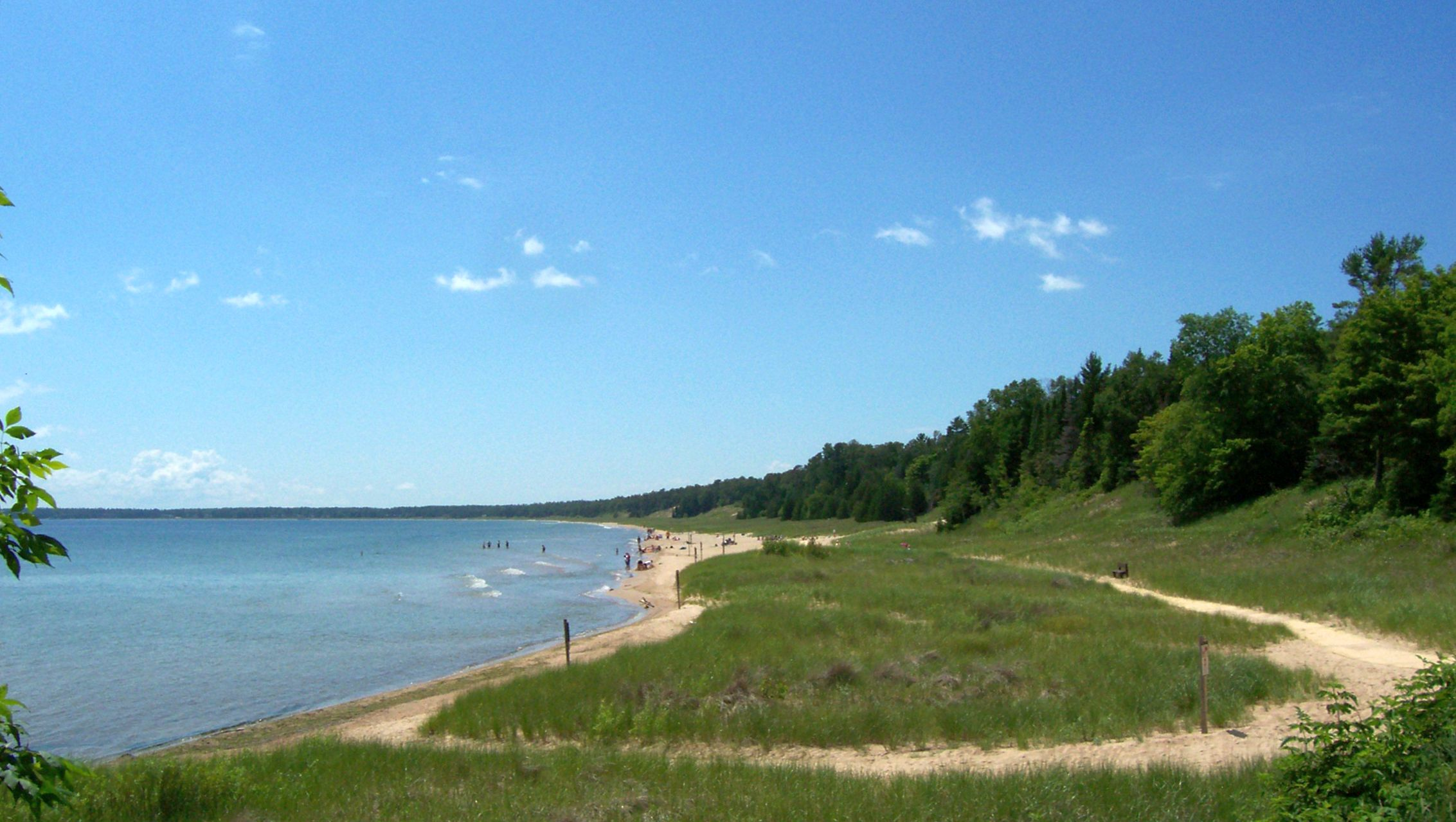
- View from land of the shipwreck site

- Location within Wisconsin
- Location: Lake Michigan off the coast of Door County, Wisconsin
- Coordinates: 44°53′7″N 87°9′8″W
- NRHP reference No.: 06000639
- Added to NRHP: July 19, 2006

The Ocean Wave was a scow schooner that sank in Lake Michigan off the coast of Door County, Wisconsin, United States. In 2006 the shipwreck site was added to the National Register of Historic Places.

== History ==
Ocean Wave was built in Michigan in 1860. On September 23, 1869, the ship was headed for White Lake Township, Michigan carrying a load of limestone. Shortly after 3:00 a.m., she foundered in a storm. All members of the crew survived.
