= Thomas J. Minar =

American academic administrator

Thomas J. Minar is an American academic administrator who was the 16th president of Franklin College in Franklin, Indiana. In January 2020, he was arrested and charged with child sex crimes, In March 2022, he was found guilty of child enticement and child pornography charges, and in June he was sentenced to six years in prison.
