= Green Bay (shipwreck) =

Name given to an unidentified sloop that sank in Lake Michigan

- Green Bay shipwreck (sloop)
- U.S. National Register of Historic Places
- Location: Lake Michigan off the coast of Sevastopol, Wisconsin
- NRHP reference No.: 09000952
- Added to NRHP: November 18, 2009

Green Bay is the name given to an unidentified sloop that sank in Lake Michigan off the coast of Sevastopol, Wisconsin. In 2009, the shipwreck site was added to the National Register of Historic Places.

== History ==
Based on the features and style of the sloop, it is dated to have been built sometime from 1840 to 1860. The shipwreck is the only known one of a commercial freighting sloop in Wisconsin waters. Added to the fact that there is no historic record of construction of a commercial freighting sloop, it makes the site a popular one for archaeologists.
