= L. A. Larson & Co. Store =

- U.S. National Register of Historic Places
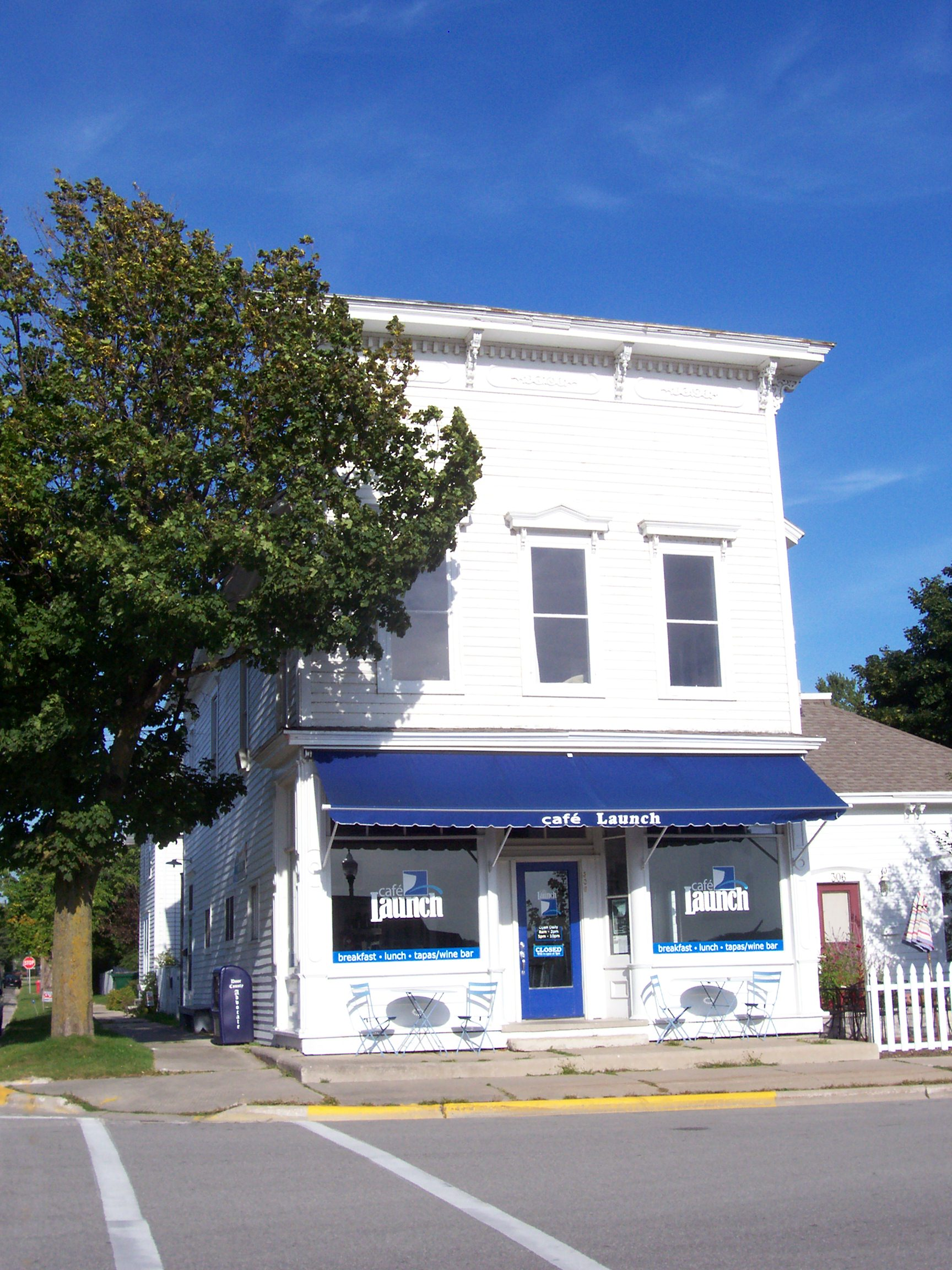
- L. A. Larson & Co. Store
- Location: 306 S. 3rd Ave., Sturgeon Bay, Wisconsin
- Coordinates: 44°49′55″N 87°22′25″W
- Area: 0.3 acres (0.12 ha)
- Built: 1875
- Architect: L. Adolph Larson
- Architectural style: Italianate
- NRHP reference No.: 85001357
- Added to NRHP: June 19, 1985

The L. A. Larson & Co. Store building is located in Sturgeon Bay, Wisconsin.

== History ==
The store manufactured a variety of woodwork products, including furniture and caskets. Other businesses to operate in the building include a law firm and a restaurant. It was listed on the National Register of Historic Places in 1985 and on the State Register of Historic Places in 1989.
