= Detroit Harbor, Wisconsin =

Detroit Harbor
- Unincorporated community
- Location within the state of Wisconsin
- Coordinates: 45°21′24″N 86°55′50″W
- Country: United States
- State: Wisconsin
- County: Door
- Town: Washington Island
- Elevation: 604 ft (184 m)
- Time zone: UTC-6 (Central (CST))
  - Summer (DST): UTC-5 (CDT)
- ZIP codes: 54246
- Area code: 920
- GNIS feature ID: 1584512

Detroit Harbor is an unincorporated community located in the Town of Washington Island on Washington Island in Door County, Wisconsin, United States. The Washington Island Ferry runs scheduled passenger service to Northport from Detroit Harbor. Detroit Harbor is also home to a United States Post Office and Coast Guard Station Washington Island. A bay named Detroit Harbor is adjacent to the community.

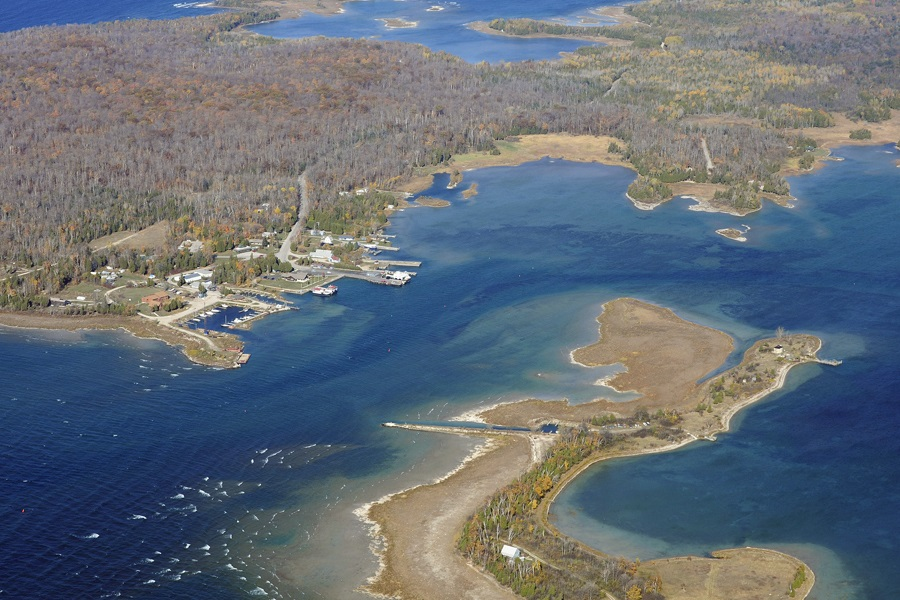
An aerial photo from the Coast Guard
