= SS Louisiana =

Steamboat that sank in Lake Michigan

- Louisiana (shipwreck)
- U.S. National Register of Historic Places
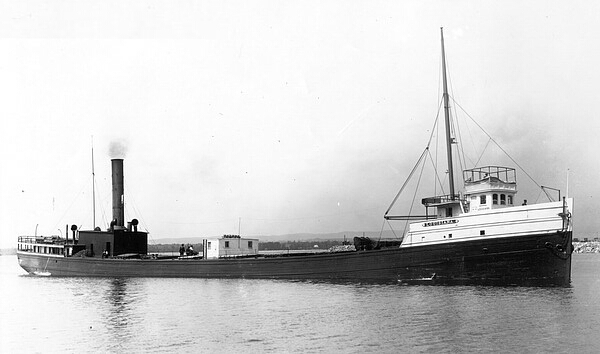
- The Louisiana prior to the storm

- Location within Wisconsin
- Location: Lake Michigan off the coast of Washington, Door County, Wisconsin
- Coordinates: 45°23′58.8″N 86°55′21.6″W
- NRHP reference No.: 92000104
- Added to NRHP: March 19, 1992

Louisiana was a steamboat that sank in Lake Michigan off the coast of Washington, Door County, Wisconsin, United States, during the Great Lakes Storm of 1913. In 1992 the shipwreck site was added to the National Register of Historic Places.

== History ==
The Louisiana was constructed in Marine City, Michigan in 1887, while her engine was built at the Dry Dock Complex in Detroit, Michigan.

On November 2, 1913, the Louisiana departed from Lorain, Ohio to deliver a load of coal to Milwaukee, Wisconsin. After completing her stop in Milwaukee, the Louisiana made way for Escanaba, Michigan to pick up a load of iron ore. In the early morning hours of November 8, the ship passed through Porte des Morts. Upon reaching the strait, she was greeted by a severe snowstorm. The captain attempted to take refuge at Washington Island in Door County, Wisconsin, but the heavy seas and howling wind proved too strong for the ship's anchors to hold her in place, and she was run aground.

Despite the situation on board the Louisiana, the crew opted to remain aboard the vessel rather than taking the one small lifeboat they had out to the raging seas. However, a fire broke out in the cargo hold later that morning, and the crew members were left with no choice. A rescue ship had been deployed from Plum Island, but the breaking waves were too powerful for the ship to be able to reach the crew. In the end, the crew was able to make it to shore.

The ship's boiler, engine, propeller, propeller shaft, and rudder were later salvaged. Currently, the site is a popular area for divers and archaeologists. It lies in 10 to 25 feet (3.0 to 7.6 m) of water on the southeast side of Washington Harbor.

The part of the ship lies so low in the water that you could stand and have 75% of your body out of the water. The water could and has gotten so low that the higher part may stick out of the water.
