= Washington Island (Wisconsin) =

Island in Lake Michigan

- Location within Wisconsin Location within the United States

Geography
- Location: Door County, Wisconsin
- Coordinates: 45°22′37″N 86°53′47″W
- Area: 23.51 sq mi (60.9 km^{2})
- Length: 6 mi (10 km)
- Width: 5 mi (8 km)
- Highest elevation: 705 ft (214.9 m)

Administration
- United States
- State: Wisconsin
- County: Door County
- Town: Washington Island

Demographics
- Population: 708 (2010)

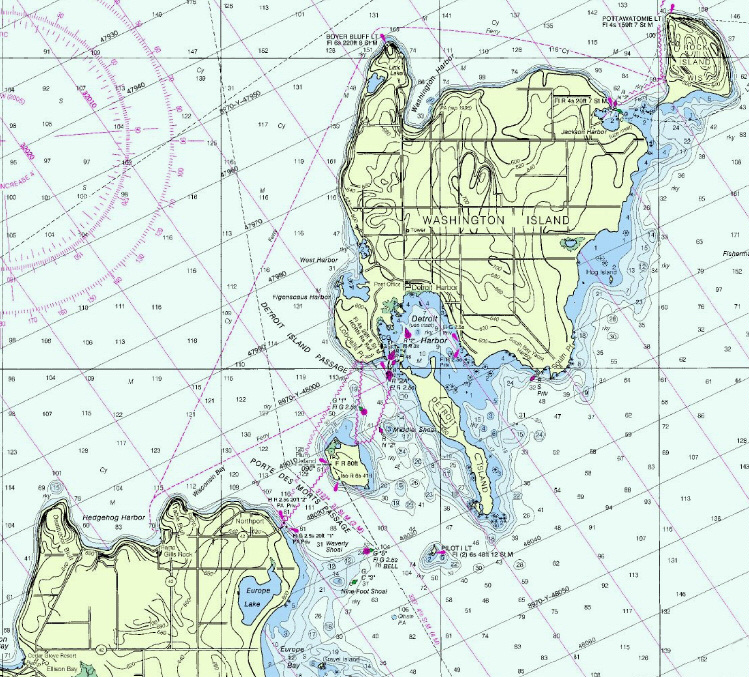
Washington Island

Washington Island is an island of the state of Wisconsin situated in Lake Michigan. Lying about 7 miles (11 km) northeast of the tip of the Door Peninsula, it is part of Door County, Wisconsin. The island has a year-round population of 708 people according to the 2010 census. It has a land area of 60.9 km^{2} (23.51 sq mi) and comprises over 92 percent of the land area of the town of Washington, as well as all of its population. The unincorporated community of Detroit Harbor is situated on the island. It is the largest in a group of islands that includes Plum, Detroit, Hog, Pilot, Fish, and Rock Islands. These islands form the Town of Washington. Detroit Harbor bay is on the south side of the island. A large part of Washington Island's economy is based on tourism.

Washington Island is approximately 5 miles (8 km) wide by 6 miles (10 km) long. Together with the Door Peninsula, Washington Island forms a treacherous strait that connects Green Bay to the rest of Lake Michigan. Early French explorers named this water way, now littered with shipwrecks, Porte des Morts, which literally means "Door of the Dead" or, more colloquially, "Death's Door", giving both Door County and Door Peninsula their names.

== History ==
Washington Island is one of a string of islands (which are an outcropping of the Niagara Escarpment) stretching across the entrance of Green Bay from the Door Peninsula in Wisconsin to the Garden Peninsula in Michigan. One early name is "Wassekiganeso," an Ojibwa name that translates to "his breast is shining" and apparently refers to the glint of the sun that at times reflects off the limestone cliffs. Another Native American name is "Me-she-ne-mah-ke-ming" or "Leader Island".

The earliest records and maps of the French, with whom written history of the region begins, do not name the individual islands, but refer to them all as a group. The names chosen depended on which group of Native Americans they found on the islands at the time. The most common name from after 1650 to 1816 was the Potawatomi Islands. The Potawatomi appear to have first come to especially the southern islands in the string about 1641 (at which time they may figure into the naming of Porte des Morts), then left the area for a while, and then returned again and remained there for a considerable length of time. The French form of this name (also variously spelled) is l'Isle des Poux, based on a shortened form of the tribe's name. This shortened form also appears as "Pous" and is at times erroneously confused with Puans, which refers to the Winnebago.

Before 1800, however, a few other names were applied to these islands. The Jesuit Records of 1670–1672 refer to them as the Huron Islands. Other records of the time refer to them as the Noquet Islands, named for the small band of Ojibwa that lived in the area of what is now called Big Bay de Noc, as well as, for a time, on Washington Island. Jonathan Carver, who traveled the area in the late 18th century, called them, simply, the Islands of the Grand Traverse.

In July 1816, Col. John Miller garrisoned a new fort at the head of Green Bay to be called Fort Howard. Three schooners and one sloop sailed from Mackinac. They were the sloop Amelia and the schooners Wayne, Mink, and Washington, the last being the largest and flagship of the fleet, as well as, reportedly, the largest vessel on the lakes at the time. The fleet was separated en route, and the Washington anchored in what is now Washington Harbor to wait for the others. With two days of waiting, some of the crew explored the island, and the officers, assuming theirs was the first ship to anchor there, named the harbor after the ship and in honor of President Washington. They also named various islands in the area after significant members of their party, with the name of Col. John Miller being honored on the largest island as Millers Island. Other members of the party included Maj. Talbot Chambers, John O'Fallon, and Joseph Kean. Chambers Island retains its name today, while Keans Island and Fallons Island are now called Rock and Detroit Islands, respectively.

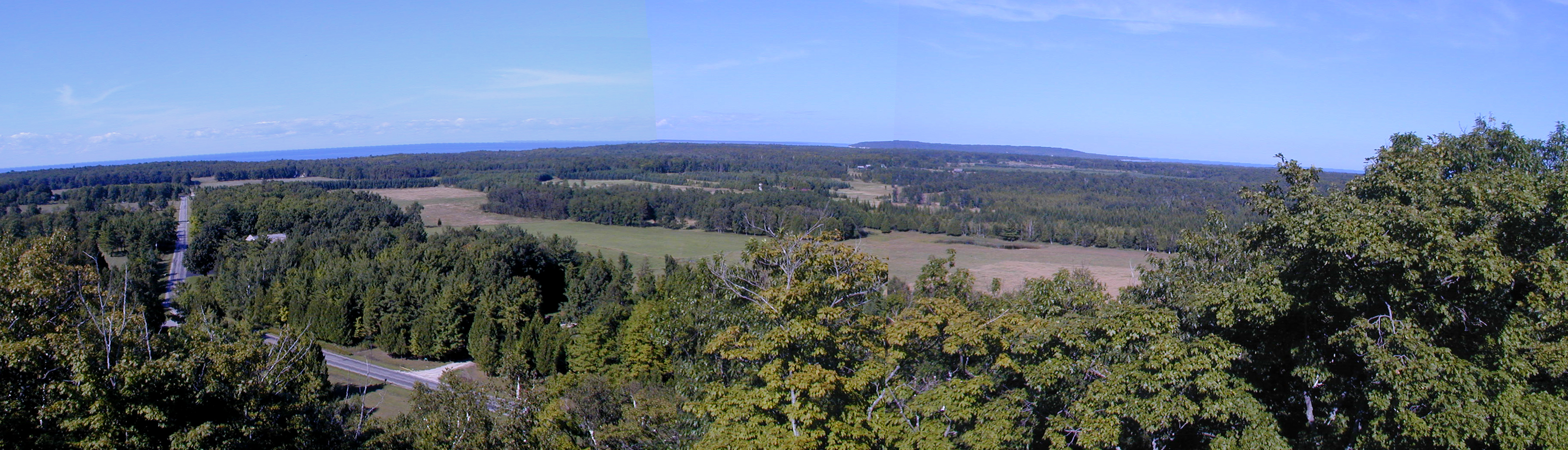
View from the north through the east from the currently closed lookout tower at Mountain Park near center of island.

Not every map maker or journalist, however, knew of or paid attention to this. The names of Potawatomi and Louse continued to be used by many for many years, with a continued variety of spellings. At times Potawatomi was applied to the main island; sometimes to what is now Rock Island. At times the main island was missing from the map. When the lighthouse was built on Rock Island, it was called Pottawatomie Light, the name it has retained. While a few maps did chart either [?]ellens or Mellens Island (a possible corruption of Miller), the settlement of the island began with the fishers and craftsmen living around Washington Harbor. A large non-Native American presence did not begin until the 1830s, when settlers on their way to Green Bay heard of large sized trout. Most of these settlers were Icelandic and Irish. These settlers commonly called the whole island by the name of their harbor and in the census of 1850, "Washington Island" appeared.

The border between Wisconsin and Michigan was originally defined as "the most usual ship channel" into Green Bay from Lake Michigan but commercial routes existed both to the north and south of the island which led to a border dispute. In 1936, the U.S. Supreme Court decision Wisconsin v. Michigan found that Washington and other nearby islands were part of Wisconsin.

== Culture ==
A majority of the people who settled on the island were Scandinavian immigrants, especially Icelanders. Today, Washington Island is one of the oldest Icelandic communities in the United States and among the largest outside Iceland itself. Because of a loophole exploited during Prohibition by the owner of Nelsen's Hall (one of the few bars on the island at the time), taking shots of Angostura Bitters is a local tradition. Washington Island's population consumes more bitters than anyone else in the world.

From 1896 to 1926, the economist Thorstein Veblen spent summers at his study cabin on Washington Island. On the island he learned Icelandic, which allowed him to write articles accepted by an Icelandic newspaper and translate the Laxdæla saga into English.

In 1914, Washington Island was the setting for a juvenile fiction novel by Harry Lincoln Sayler under the pen name "Gordon Stuart".

== Modern day ==
Washington Island hosts the Midwest region's largest lavender farm, accompanied by a biennial festival held in summer. Two town parks, one county park, two town beaches, one public boat ramp, and three State Natural Areas dot the island. A fine arts school, the Sievers School of Fiber Arts, also calls the island home. There is one commercial fisherman on the island.

== Climate ==
Washington Island has a humid continental climate influenced to some degree by its offshore position in Lake Michigan. This results in summer temperatures being moderated, seasonal lag being prevalent and winters being less cold than in western Wisconsin on the same latitude.

Climate data for Washington Island, Wisconsin (1991–2020 normals, extremes 1944–present)
Month	Jan	Feb	Mar	Apr	May	Jun	Jul	Aug	Sep	Oct	Nov	Dec	Year
Record high °F (°C)	49 (9)	57 (14)	71 (22)	77 (25)	87 (31)	92 (33)	94 (34)	97 (36)	94 (34)	84 (29)	71 (22)	58 (14)	97 (36)
Mean daily maximum °F (°C)	25.7 (−3.5)	27.5 (−2.5)	36.2 (2.3)	47.4 (8.6)	59.2 (15.1)	69.5 (20.8)	75.6 (24.2)	75.3 (24.1)	67.7 (19.8)	54.9 (12.7)	42.4 (5.8)	31.9 (−0.1)	51.1 (10.6)
Daily mean °F (°C)	18.2 (−7.7)	19.1 (−7.2)	27.9 (−2.3)	38.6 (3.7)	49.6 (9.8)	59.9 (15.5)	66.3 (19.1)	66.2 (19.0)	59.3 (15.2)	47.2 (8.4)	35.6 (2.0)	25.6 (−3.6)	42.8 (6.0)
Mean daily minimum °F (°C)	10.8 (−11.8)	10.7 (−11.8)	19.6 (−6.9)	29.8 (−1.2)	40.0 (4.4)	50.4 (10.2)	56.9 (13.8)	57.2 (14.0)	50.8 (10.4)	39.6 (4.2)	28.8 (−1.8)	19.3 (−7.1)	34.5 (1.4)
Record low °F (°C)	−27 (−33)	−26 (−32)	−26 (−32)	5 (−15)	20 (−7)	24 (−4)	35 (2)	32 (0)	26 (−3)	18 (−8)	1 (−17)	−21 (−29)	−27 (−33)
Average precipitation inches (mm)	1.58 (40)	1.14 (29)	1.73 (44)	2.88 (73)	2.97 (75)	3.08 (78)	2.84 (72)	3.02 (77)	3.22 (82)	3.60 (91)	2.34 (59)	1.78 (45)	30.18 (767)
Average snowfall inches (cm)	15.0 (38)	13.0 (33)	9.5 (24)	5.7 (14)	0.0 (0.0)	0.0 (0.0)	0.0 (0.0)	0.0 (0.0)	0.0 (0.0)	0.2 (0.51)	3.4 (8.6)	12.0 (30)	58.8 (149)
Average precipitation days (≥ 0.01 in)	10.0	7.7	7.8	9.6	11.4	10.3	9.7	9.3	9.8	11.7	9.3	9.7	116.3
Average snowy days (≥ 0.1 in)	8.7	6.9	4.9	2.4	0.1	0.0	0.0	0.0	0.0	0.2	2.6	6.5	32.3
Source: NOAA

Washington Island

Climate chart (precipitation, max. and min. temperature)
J	F	M	A	M	J	J	A	S	O	N	D
36 −3 −12	24 −2 −11	40 3 −6	61 9 −1	75 16 5	81 21 10	78 25 14	82 24 14	82 20 10	67 13 5	59 6 −1	37 −1 −7
- █ Average max. and min. temperatures in °C
- █ Precipitation totals in mm
Imperial conversion
J	F	M	A	M	J	J	A	S	O	N	D
1.4 27 10	0.9 28 12	1.6 37 21	2.4 48 30	3 61 41	3.2 70 50	3.1 77 57	3.2 75 57	3.2 68 50	2.6 55 41	2.3 43 30	1.5 30 19
- █ Average max. and min. temperatures in °F
- █ Precipitation totals in inches

== Transportation ==
Washington Island is served by two ferry routes. The first route is to take a 30-minute ferry ride from the Door Peninsula to Detroit Harbor on the island from a freight, automobile, and passenger ferry that departs daily from the Northport Pier at the northern terminus of Wisconsin Highway 42. The second route is a passenger-only ferry that departs from the unincorporated community of Gills Rock on a 20-minute route, which includes an optional bundled narrated train tour upon arriving on Washington Island.

The Washington Island Airport, a small public airport with two grass runways, is located on the island.

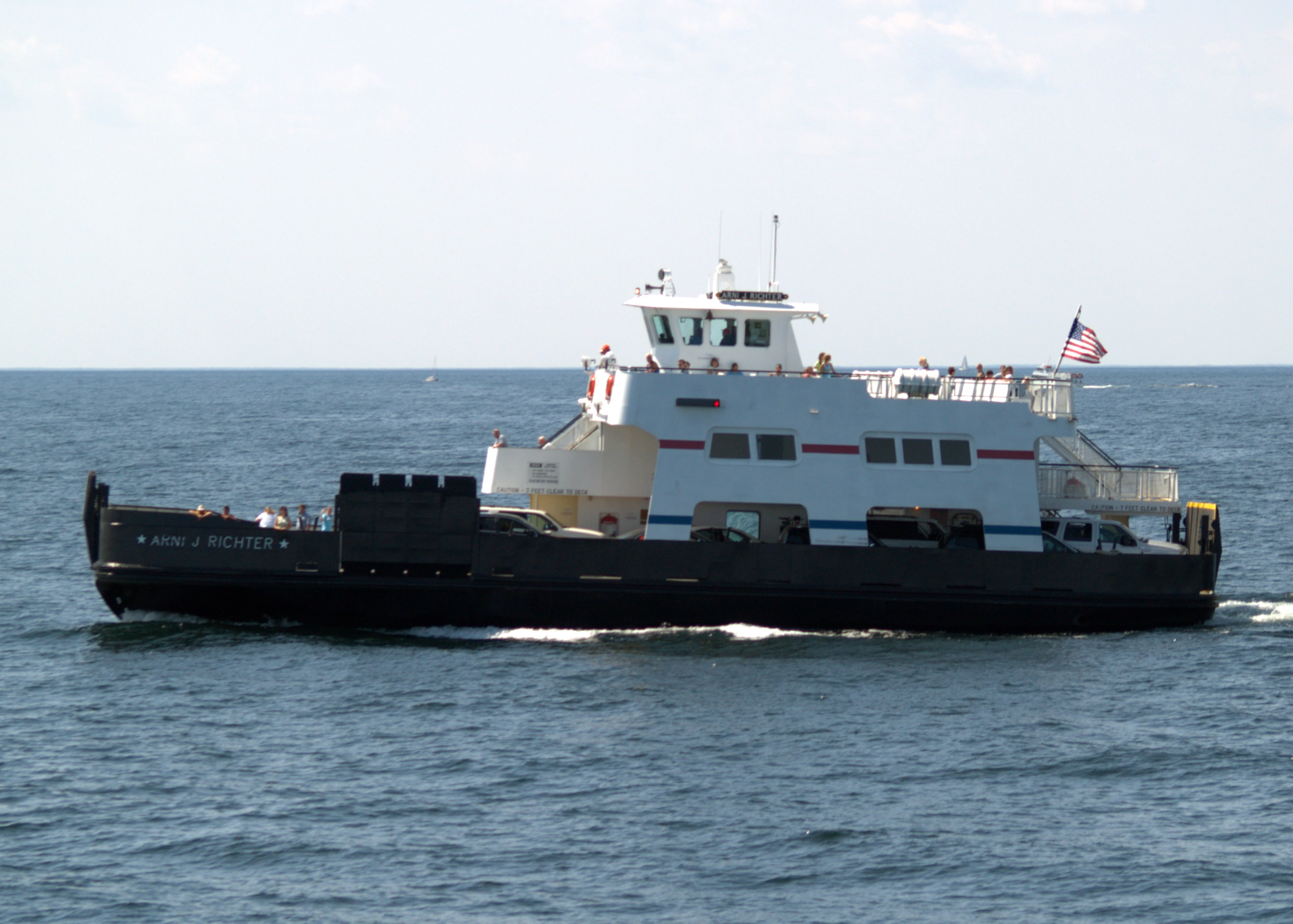
Arni J. Richter car ferry

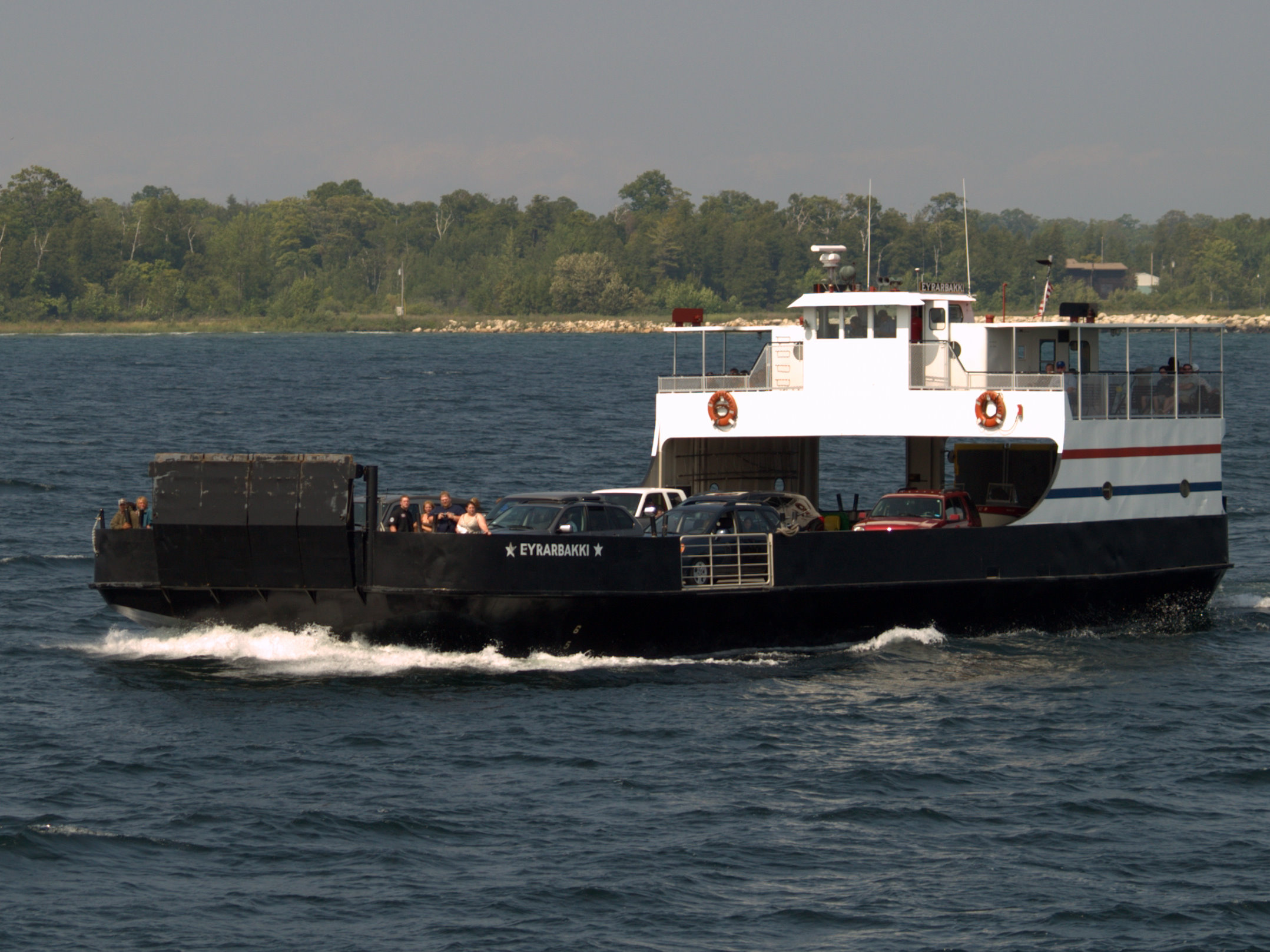
Eyrarbakki car ferry.

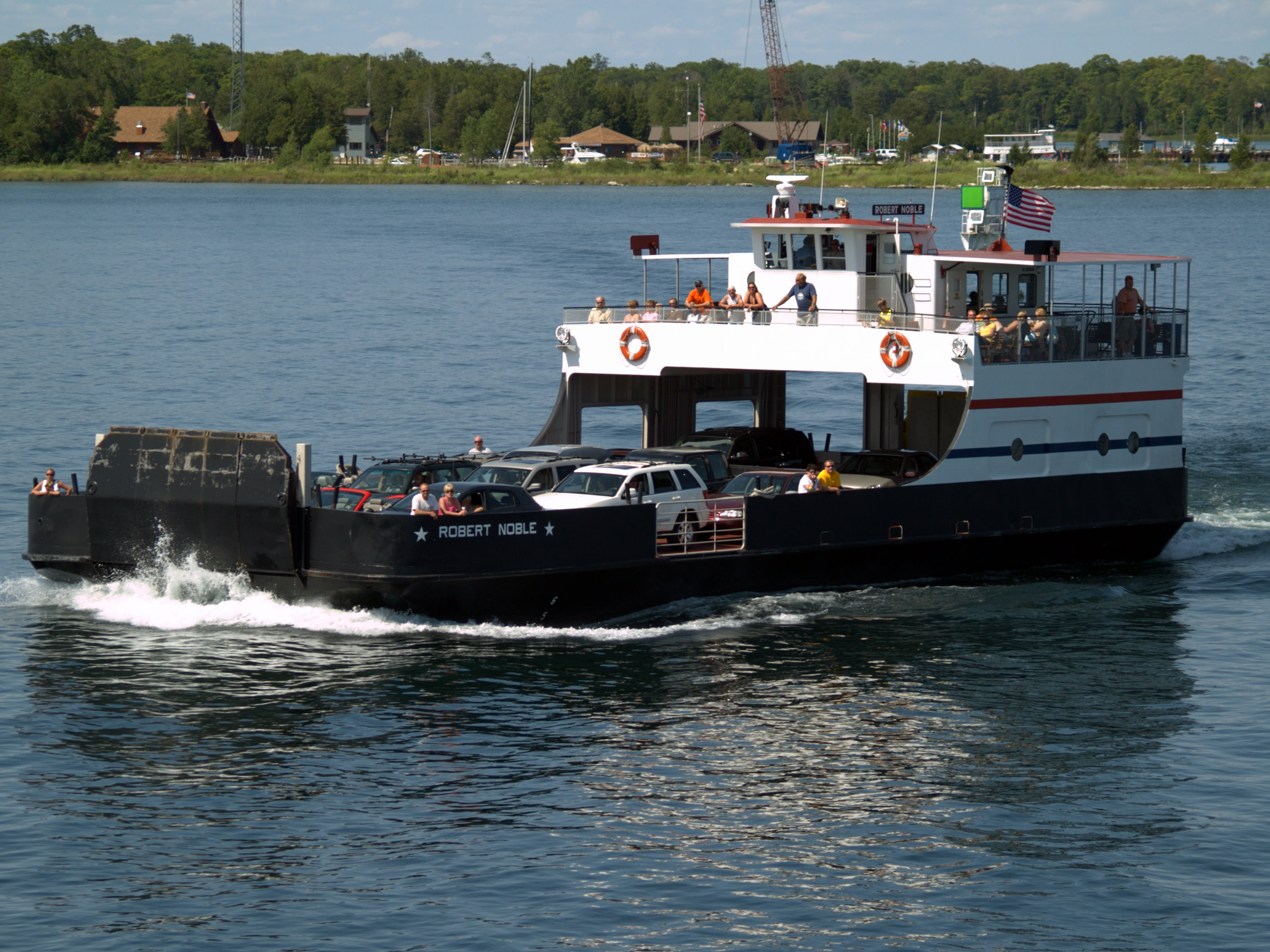
Robert Noble car ferry

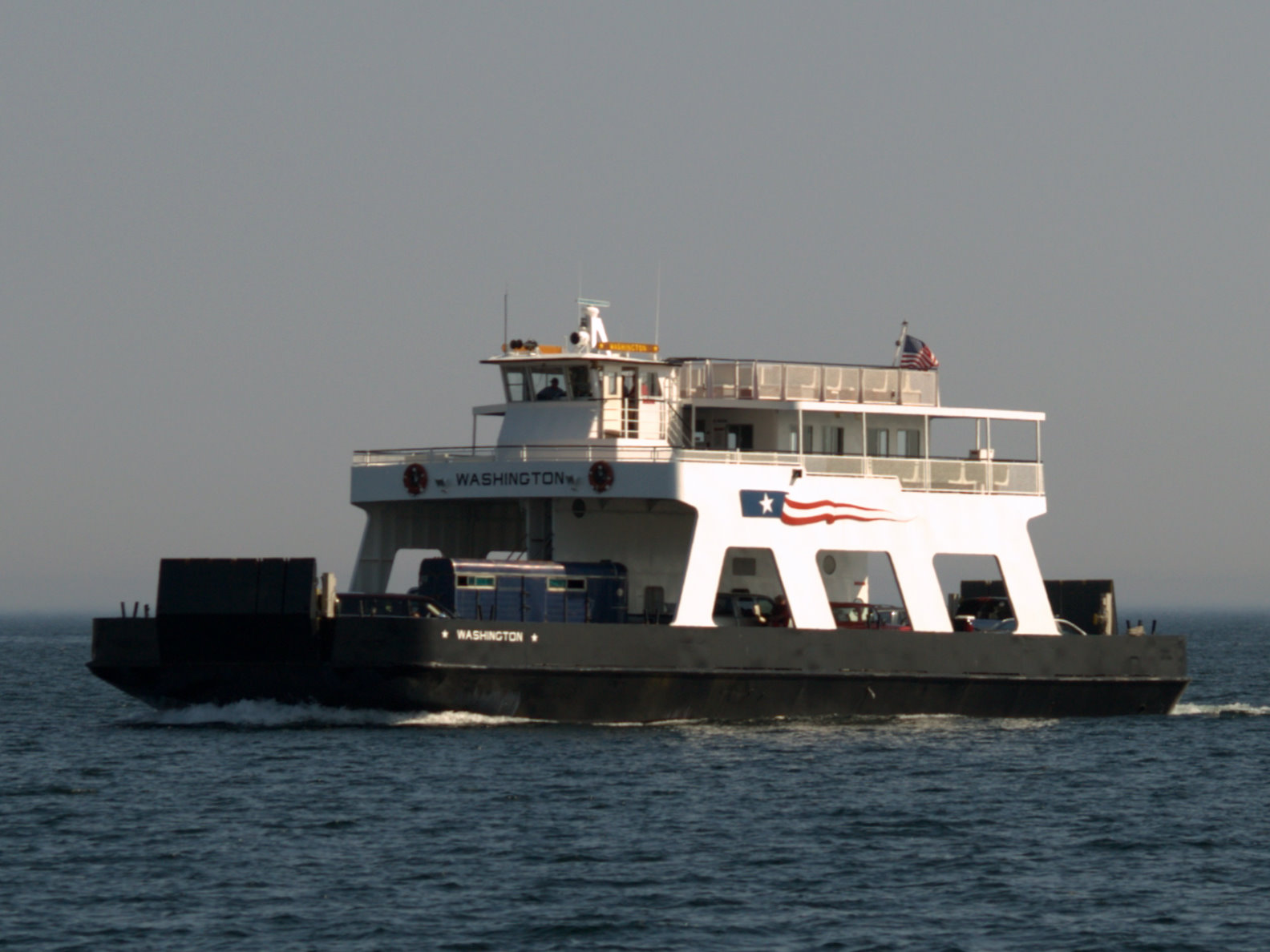
Washington car ferry

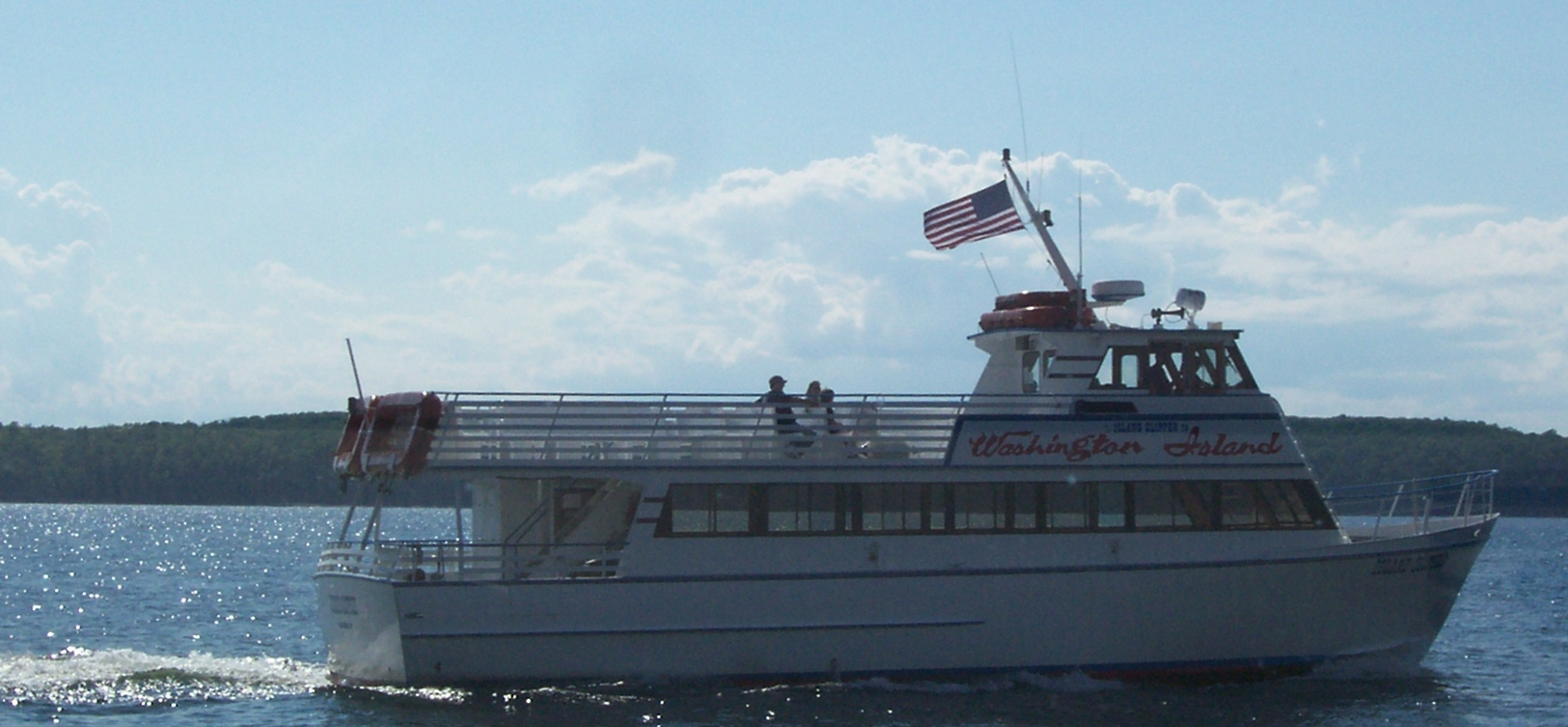
Island Clipper passenger ferry

== Gallery ==
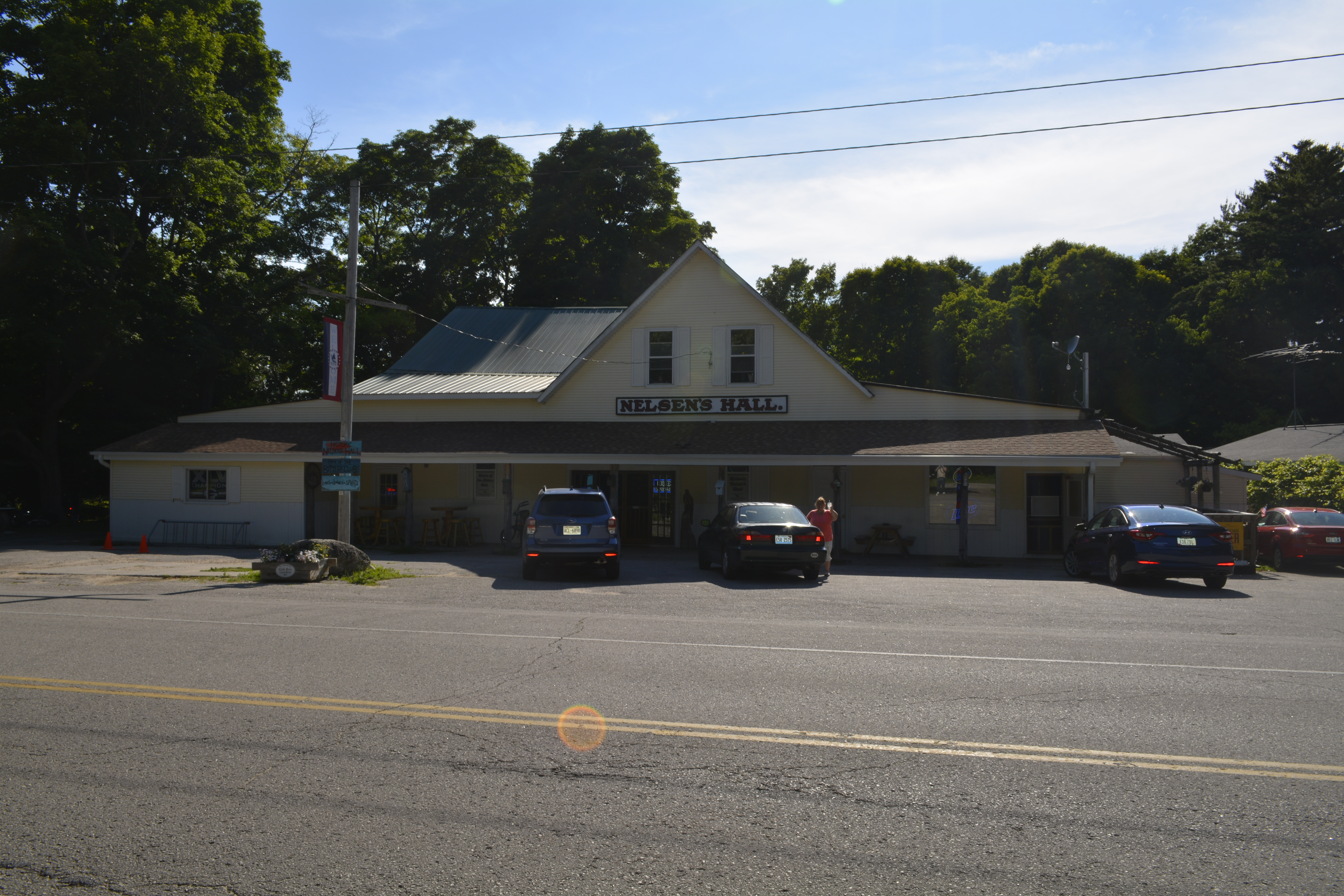
Nelsen's Hall

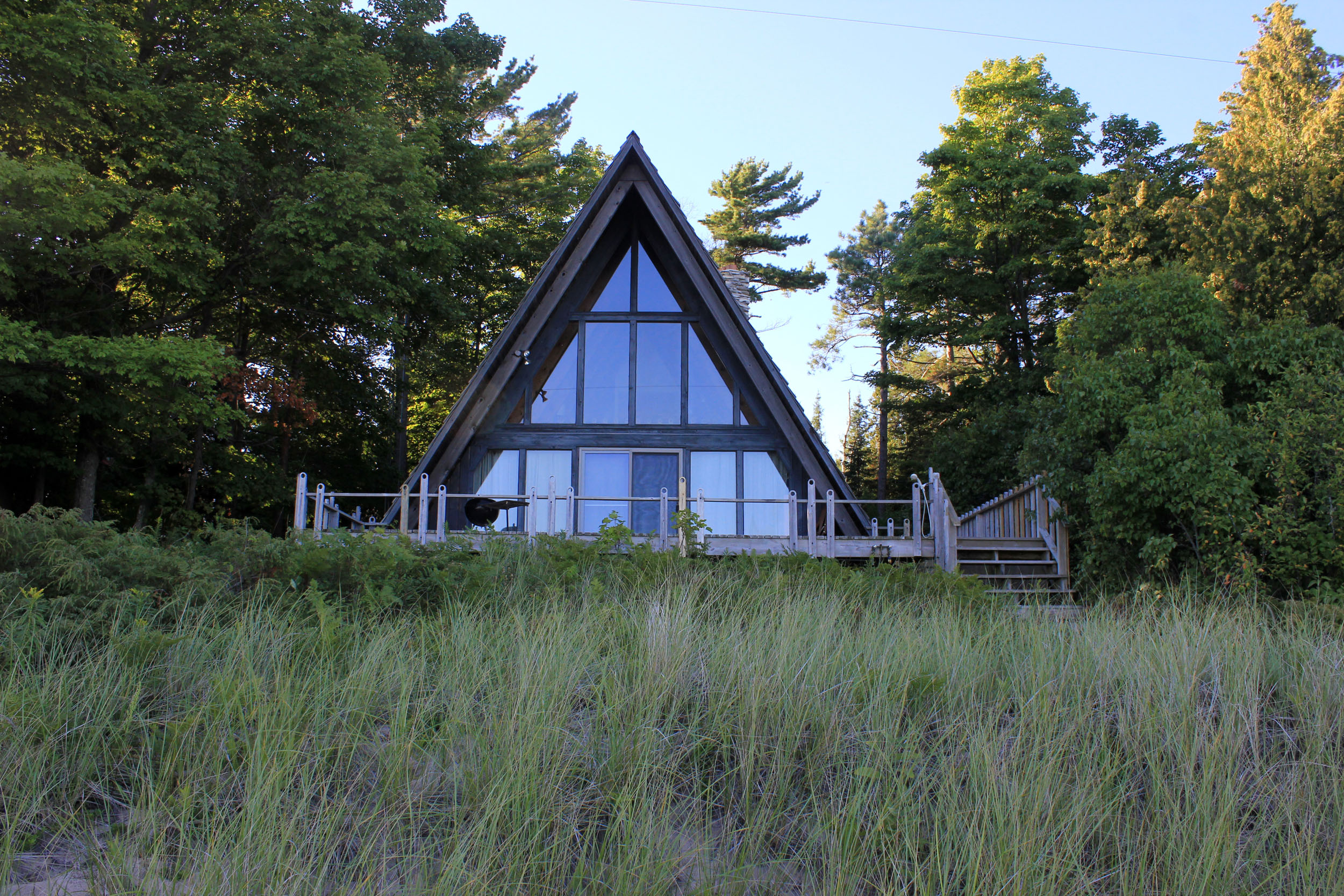
Building at Sand Dunes Park

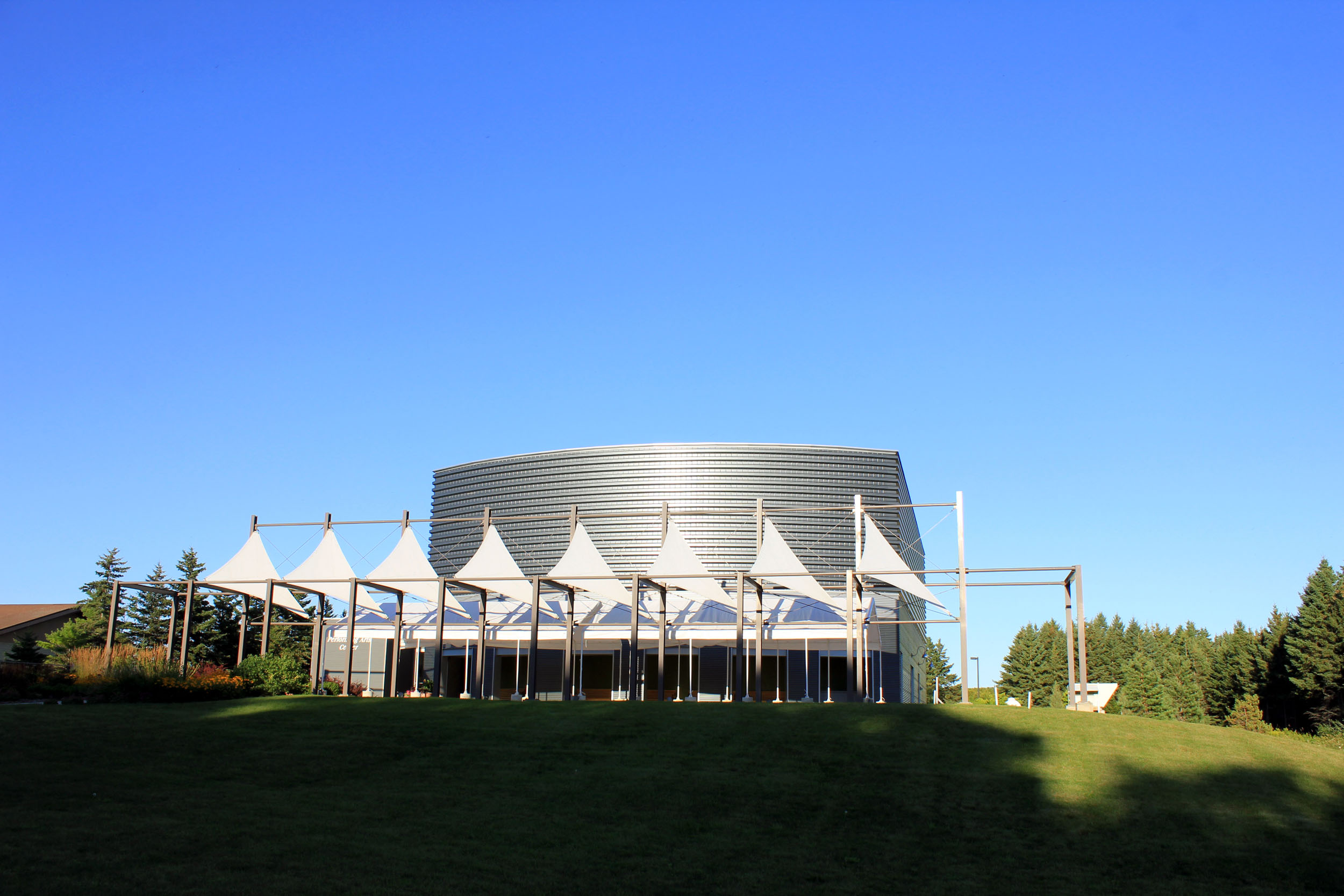
Performing Arts Center

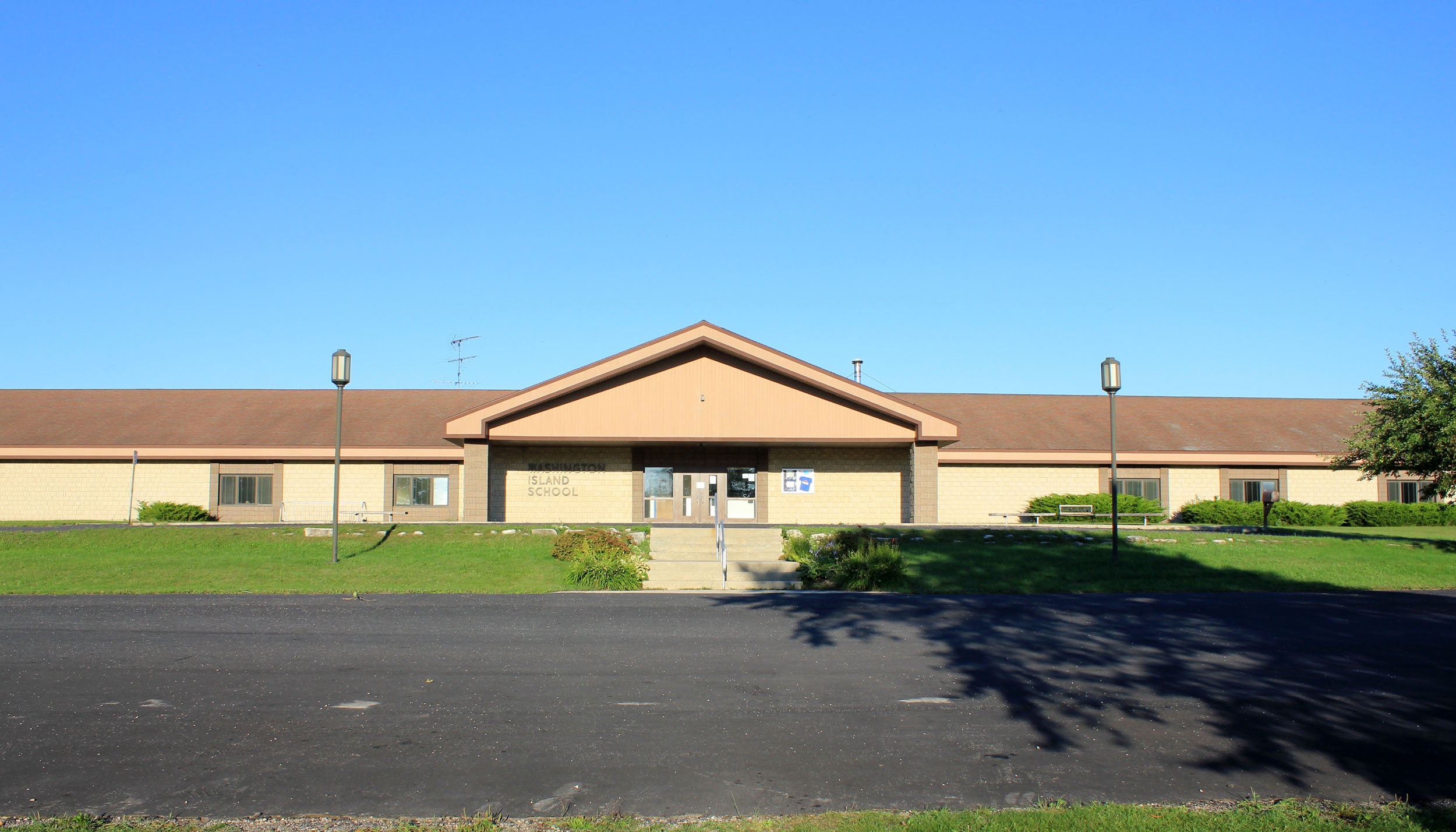
School

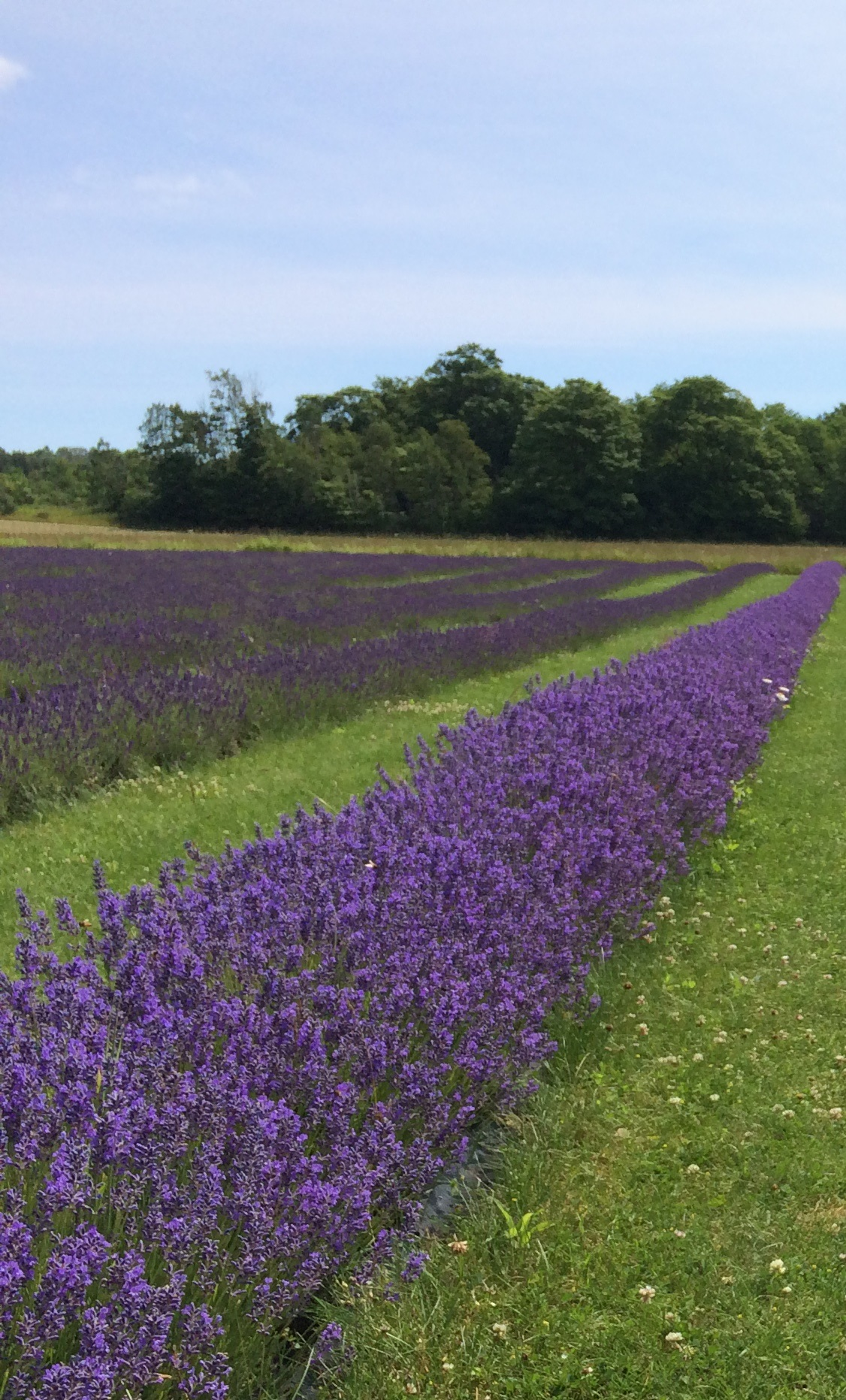
Lavender in July

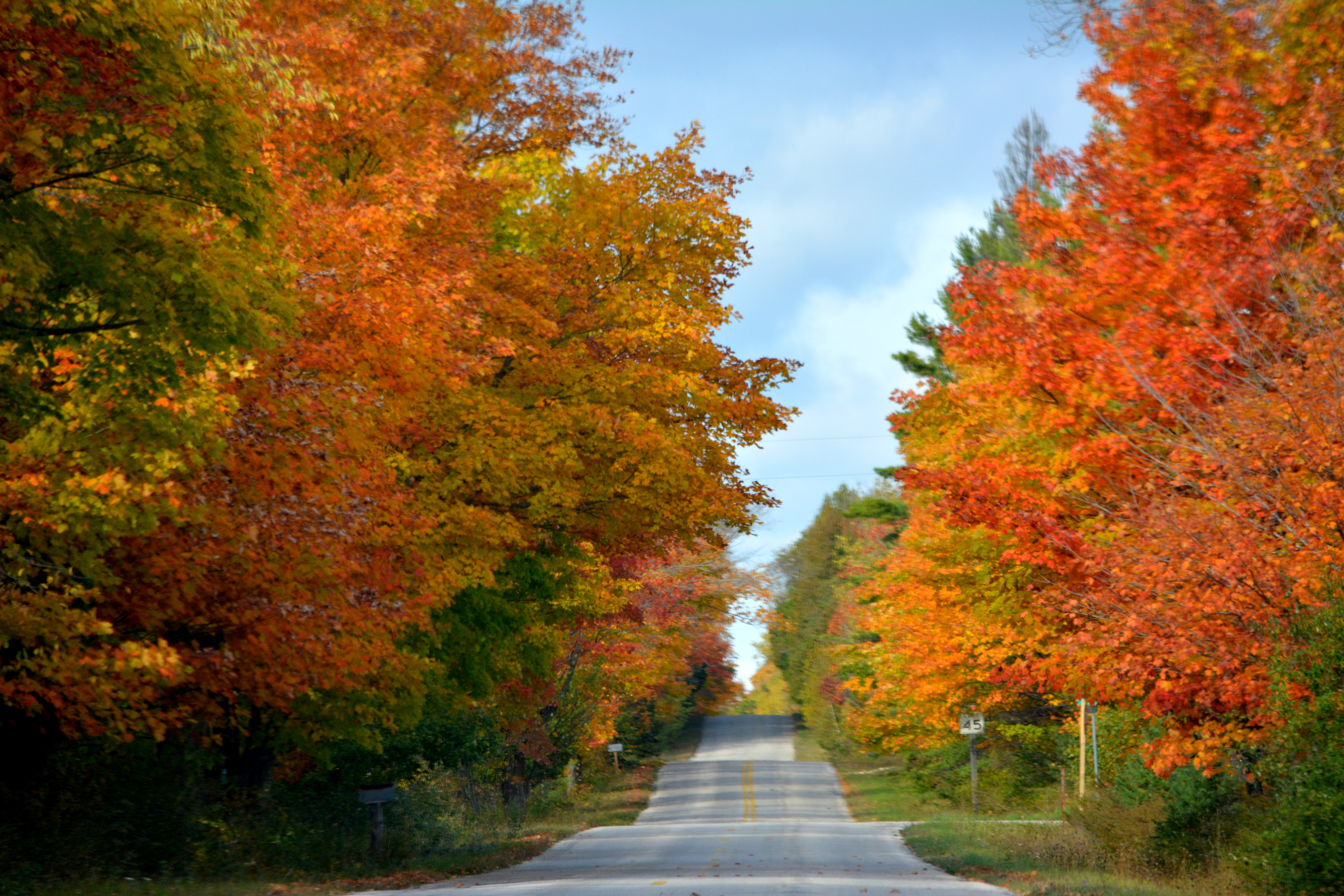
Fall color, October 20

== See also ==
- Coffee Swamp
- Populated islands of the Great Lakes
- List of islands of the United States
- Washington Island Stavkirke
- Little Lake
- SS Louisiana
- Washington island ferry
- Washington Island
