= Grapeshot (disambiguation) =

Grapeshot is a type of anti-personnel ammunition used in cannons.

Grapeshot may also refer to:

- Grape Shot (shipwreck), off the coast of Plum Island, Wisconsin, United States
- Operation Grapeshot, the final Allied attack during the Italian Campaign of the Second World War
- Whiff of grapeshot
- Grapeshot, a British developer of contextual targeting solutions, acquired by Oracle Corporation in 2018
