= Wisconsin v. Michigan =

- Supreme Court of the United States

Argued March 2, 1936 Decided March 16, 1936
- Full case name: The State of Wisconsin v. The State of Michigan
- Citations: 297 U.S. 547 (more) 56 S. Ct. 584; 80 L. Ed. 856

Case history
- Prior: 295 U.S. 455 (1935).

Holding
- The boundary between Michigan and Wisconsin is amended as stated

Court membership
- Chief Justice Charles E. Hughes Associate Justices Willis Van Devanter · James C. McReynolds; Louis Brandeis · George Sutherland; Pierce Butler · Harlan F. Stone; Owen Roberts · Benjamin N. Cardozo

Case opinion
- Majority: Unanimous

Disputed area
- Location within Wisconsin Location within the United States

Geography
- Coordinates: 45°19′17″N 86°54′58″W
- Major islands: 4: Detroit, Plum, Rock & Washington

Two Supreme Court cases, Wisconsin v. Michigan, 295 U.S. 455 (1935) and Wisconsin v. Michigan, 297 U.S. 547 (1936), settled a territorial dispute between Wisconsin and Michigan.

== Background ==
The 1836 boundary description between Wisconsin and Michigan described the line through northwest Lake Michigan as "the most usual ship channel". This description needed clarification as two routes were in use into Green Bay. Multiple islands lay in between and all were claimed as part of both Door County, Wisconsin, and Delta County, Michigan. A similar case, Michigan v. Wisconsin 270 U.S. 295 (1926), had previously been brought to the Supreme Court but was dismissed.

== Decision ==
In 1936, the Supreme Court decision chose the ship channel through the Rock Island Passage as the more common, so Wisconsin retained the intervening water area with its islands: Plum, Detroit, Washington, Hog, and Rock.

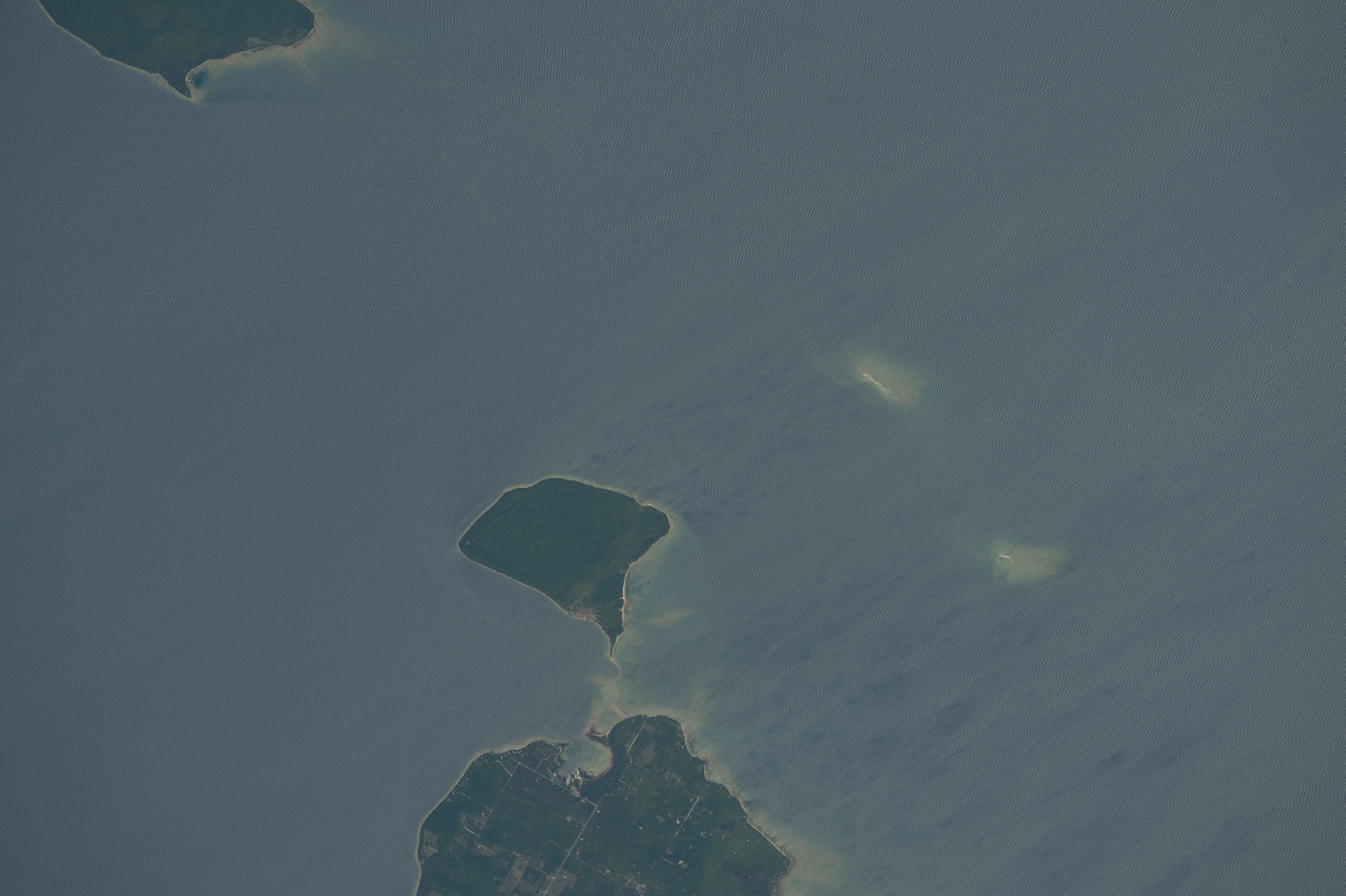
The Rock Island passage, taken on June 20, 2016 from the International Space Station. St. Martin Island in Michigan is at the top. Rock Island and the much smaller Fish Island and Fisherman's Shoal below are in Wisconsin.

== See also ==
- Toledo War: a border dispute between Michigan and Ohio
