= Washington Island Stavkirke =

Stave church in Wisconsin

Coordinates: 45°22′37.6″N 86°55′26.8″W

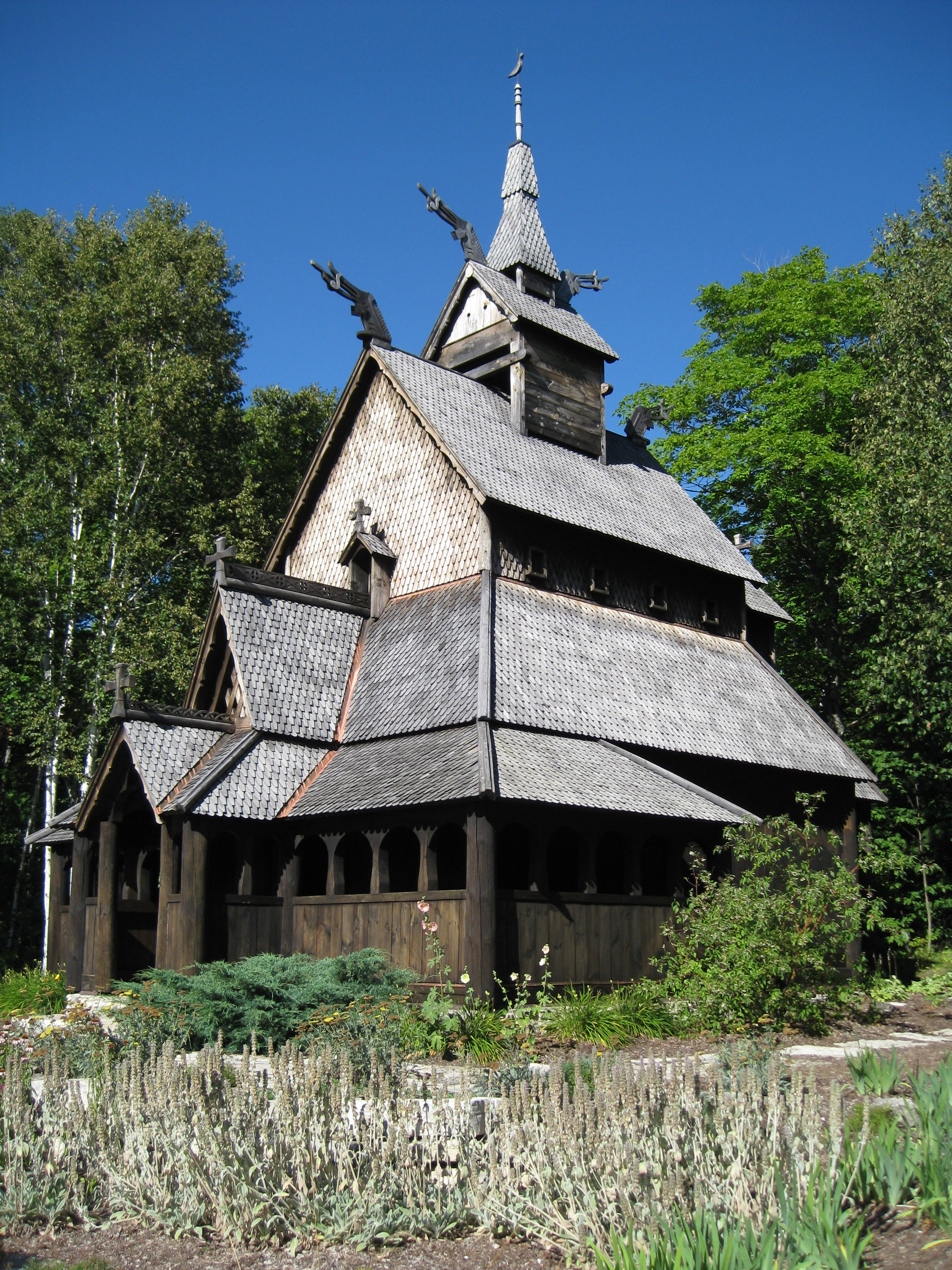

Religion
- Affiliation: Evangelical Lutheran Church in America
- Leadership: Trinity Evangelical Lutheran Church
- Status: Church

Location
- Location: Washington Island, Wisconsin
- Interactive map of Washington Island Stavkirke

Architecture
- Architect: Pat Mangan
- Style: Stave church
- Completed: 1995

Website
- www.trinitylutheran-wi.com

Washington Island Stavkirke is a stave church located in Washington Island, Wisconsin. It is owned and operated by Trinity Evangelical Lutheran Church and is positioned a few hundred yards away from it.

== Construction ==
The volunteer-led construction of the church began in 1983 and was modeled after the Borgund Stave Church which is located in the village of Borgund in Lærdal Municipality, Norway, which was built in 1150. It was created to reflect the Scandinavian heritage of Washington Island and was originally proposed by James Reiff, who was the acting pastor of Trinity Evangelical Lutheran church from 1978–1985. The building has twelve 18-foot masts all harvested locally from the island. Eleven of the masts are pine and one is white fir. 9,600 four-inch wide shingles make up the six-tiered roof of the Stavkirke. The church was completed and dedicated in the summer of 1995.

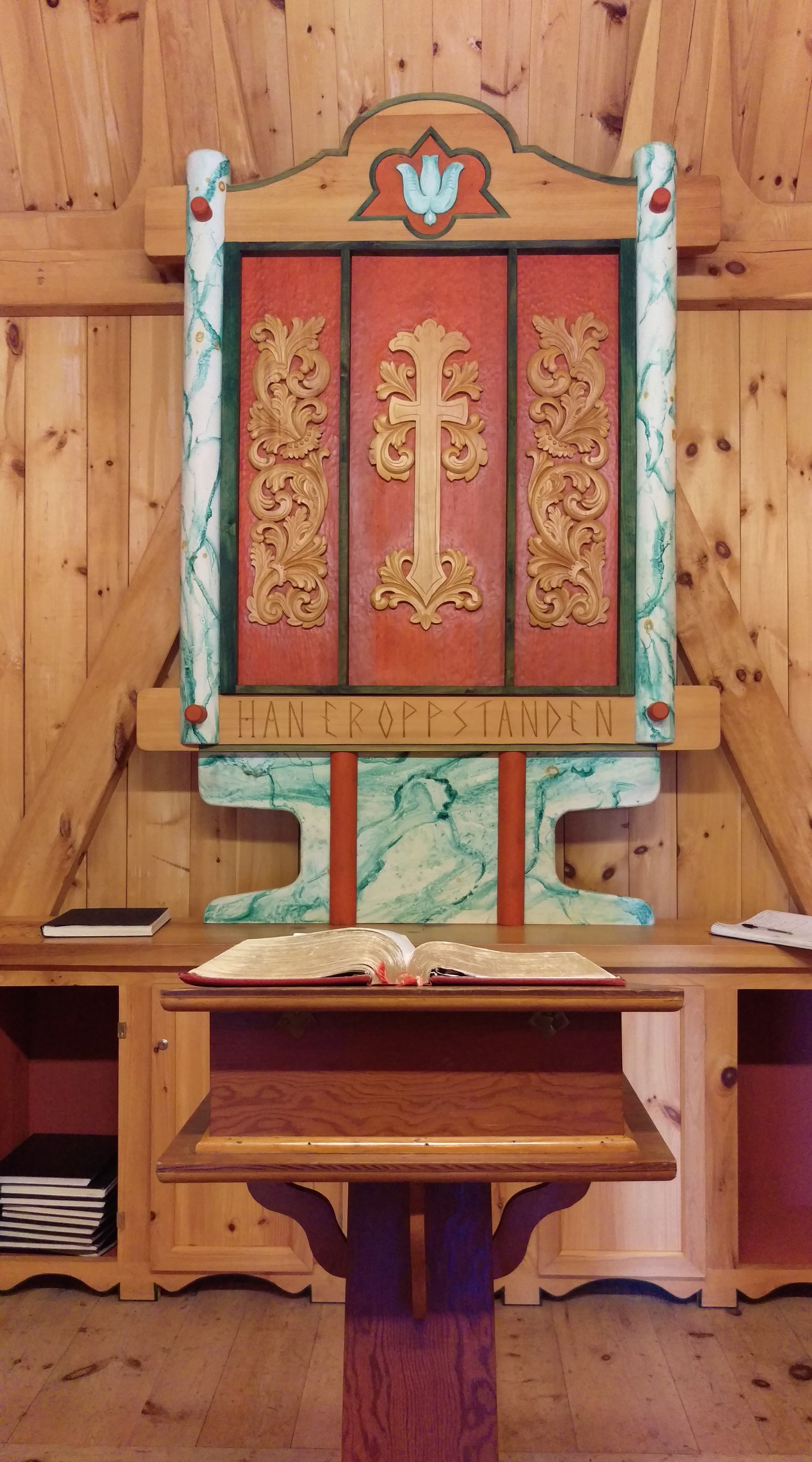
A view from inside the Washington Island Stavkirke.

== Use ==
Around 8,000–10,000 people visit the Stavkirke annually. During the summer, a weekly Wednesday service is held in the building. Baptisms and wedding ceremonies are also held in the building.
