= Washington Island Airport =

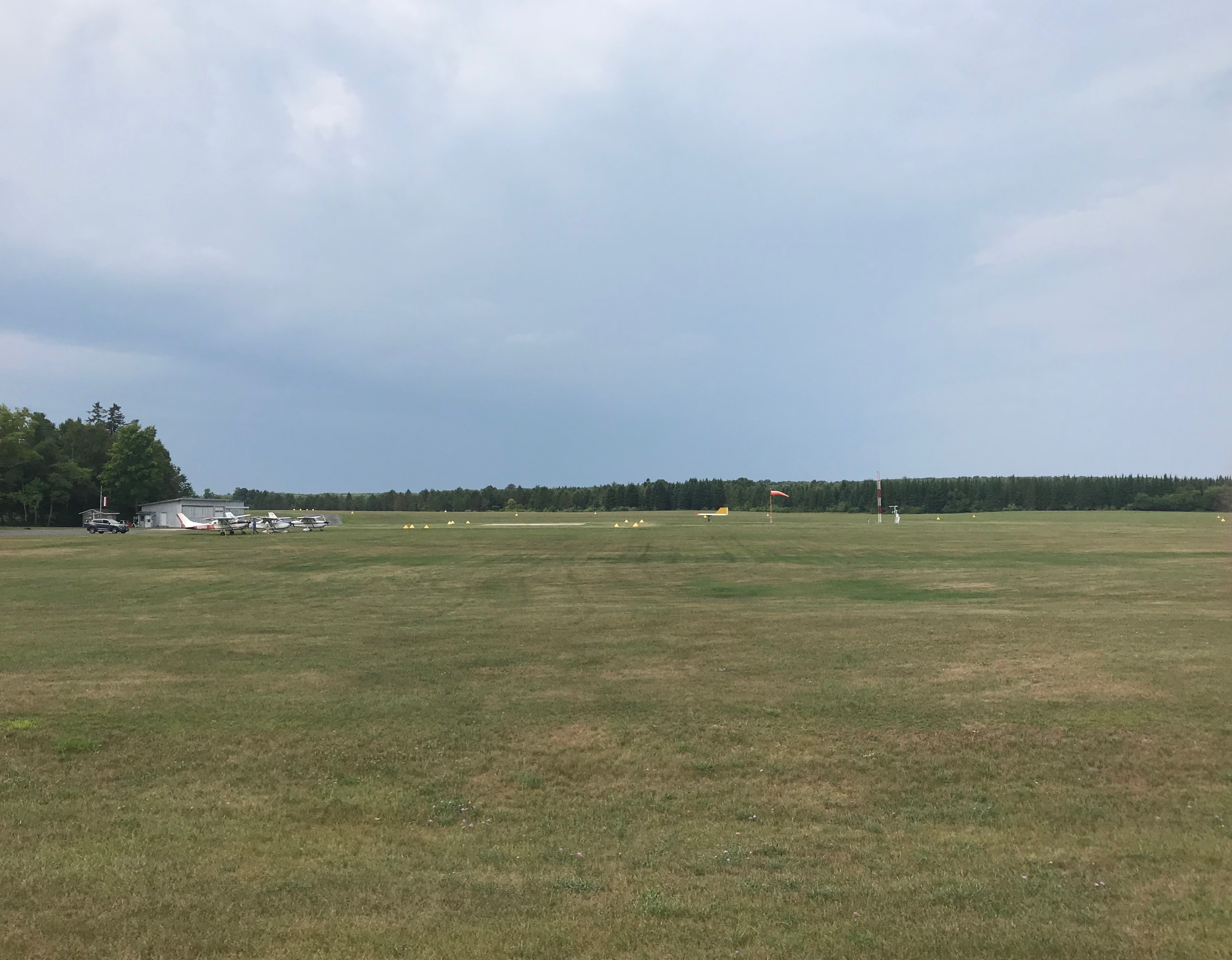
- IATA: none; ICAO: none; FAA LID: 2P2

Summary
- Airport type: Public
- Owner/Operator: Town of Washington
- Serves: Washington Island, Wisconsin
- Opened: February 1944
- Time zone: CST (UTC−06:00)
  - Summer (DST): CDT (UTC−05:00)
- Elevation AMSL: 653 ft / 199 m
- Coordinates: 45°23′18″N 086°55′27″W

Map
- Location of airport in Wisconsin 2P2 (the United States)

Runways
Direction	Length		Surface
Direction	ft	m	Surface
2/20	2,250	686	Turf
14/32	2,232	680	Turf

Statistics
- Aircraft operations (2022): 6,030
- Based aircraft (2024): 4
- Source: Federal Aviation Administration

Washington Island Airport (FAA LID: 2P2) is a town owned public use airport located on Washington Island, in the Town of Washington, Door County, Wisconsin, United States. It is included in the Federal Aviation Administration (FAA) National Plan of Integrated Airport Systems for 2025–2029, in which it is categorized as a basic general aviation facility.

== Facilities and aircraft ==
Washington Island Airport covers an area of 113 acres (46 ha) at an elevation of 653 feet (199 m) above mean sea level. It has two runways with turf surfaces: 2/20 is 2,250 by 150 feet (686 x 46 m) and 14/32 is 2,232 by 150 feet (680 x 46 m).

For the 12-month period ending August 17, 2022, the airport had 6,030 aircraft operations, an average of 17 per day: 99% general aviation and less than 1% military. In July 2024, there were 4 aircraft based at this airport: all 4 single-engine.

== Climate ==
Washington Island Airport

Climate chart (precipitation, max. and min. temperature)
J	F	M	A	M	J	J	A	S	O	N	D
66 −4 −9	60 −10 −14	62 0 −5	112 3 −1	86 9 3	77 12 10	96 18 16	73 17 15	109 16 14	119 9 7	110 6 4	66 2 1
- █ Average max. and min. temperatures in °C
- █ Precipitation totals in mm
Imperial conversion
J	F	M	A	M	J	J	A	S	O	N	D
2.6 25 16	2.4 14 7	2.4 32 23	4.4 37 30	3.4 48 37	3 54 50	3.8 64 61	2.9 63 59	4.3 61 57	4.7 48 45	4.3 43 39	2.6 36 34
- █ Average max. and min. temperatures in °F
- █ Precipitation totals in inches

== See also ==
- List of airports in Wisconsin
