= Detroit Island =

American island in Lake Michigan

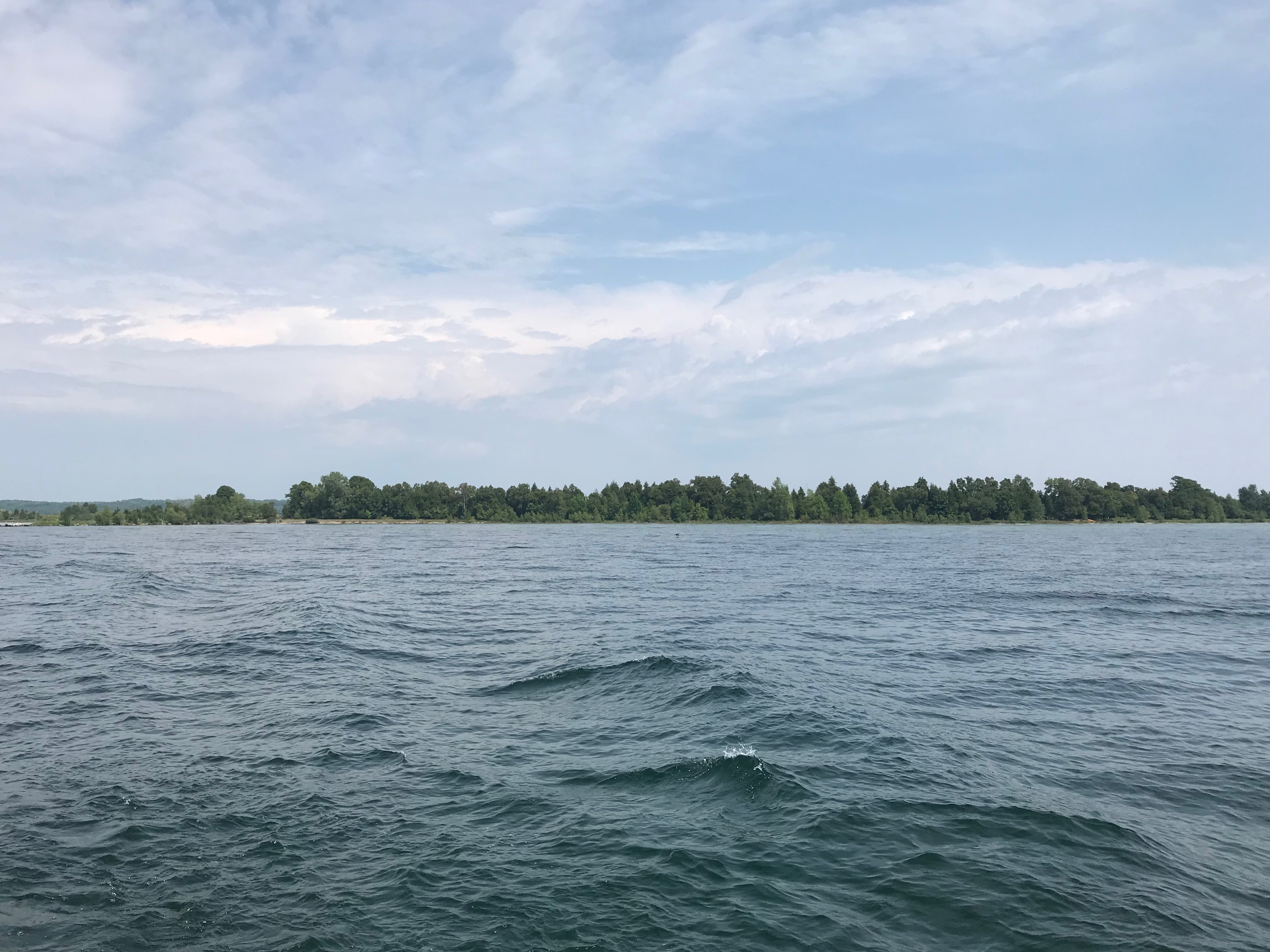
- Facing the northern side of the island from the harbor

- Location within Wisconsin Location within the United States

Geography
- Location: Door County, Wisconsin
- Coordinates: 45°19′17″N 86°54′58″W
- Area: 637.12 acres (257.83 ha)
- Highest elevation: 594 ft (181.1 m)

Administration
- United States
- State: Wisconsin
- County: Door County
- Town: Washington Island

Detroit Island is an island in Lake Michigan in the southern part of the town of Washington in Door County, Wisconsin, United States. The island has a land area of 2.578 km^{2} (0.9955 sq mi, or 637.12 acres), out of which 27.6% is open to the public. The northern end of the island borders the waters of Detroit Harbor.

In 1967 there were no taxable buildings erected on the island, but after one of the four landowners began subdividing and selling lots, seasonal residences were built. Six residences were developed by 1978. The Door County Board of Supervisors, the Town of Washington, and the Detroit Island Landowners' Association opposed plans by the state Department of Natural Resources to acquire the entire island for use as a park.

Grand Traverse Island State Park was founded in 1970 and protects slightly more than 5 acres (2.0 ha) of land on Detroit Island. It consists of five discontiguous parcels and there is no ferry access. 22.25 acres (9.00 ha) adjacent to two of the state park parcels are owned by the Door County Land Trust and are open to the public as part of the Detroit Harbor Nature Preserve.

The current purpose of the state park is to "maintain public access to provide opportunities for hunting, fishing, trapping, walking, wildlife watching and nature study and other compatible nature-based outdoor recreation activities." Deer, ruffed grouse, and waterfowl have been hunted on the island.

The state park includes areas mapped as "upland deciduous forest" and "open wetland/marsh".

148.65 acres (60.16 ha) on the southeast side is part of the Green Bay National Wildlife Refuge.

== History ==
The border between Wisconsin and Michigan was originally defined as "the most usual ship channel" into Green Bay from Lake Michigan but commercial routes existed both to the north and south of the island which led to a border dispute. In 1936, the U.S. Supreme Court decision Wisconsin v. Michigan found that Detroit and other nearby islands were part of Wisconsin.

== Gallery ==
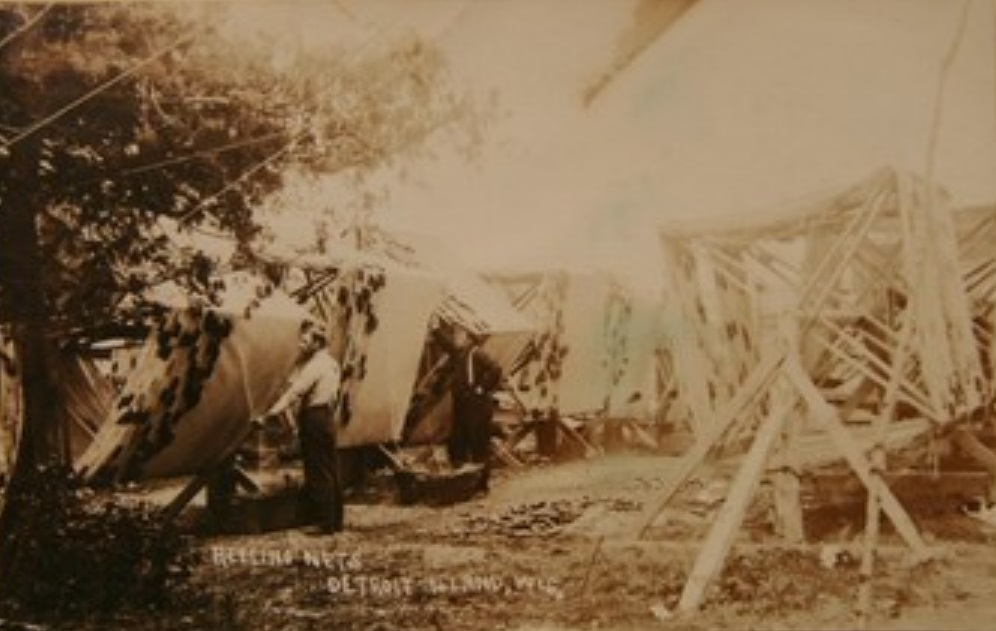
Fishermen working with nets on Detroit Island; from a postcard postmarked in 1909

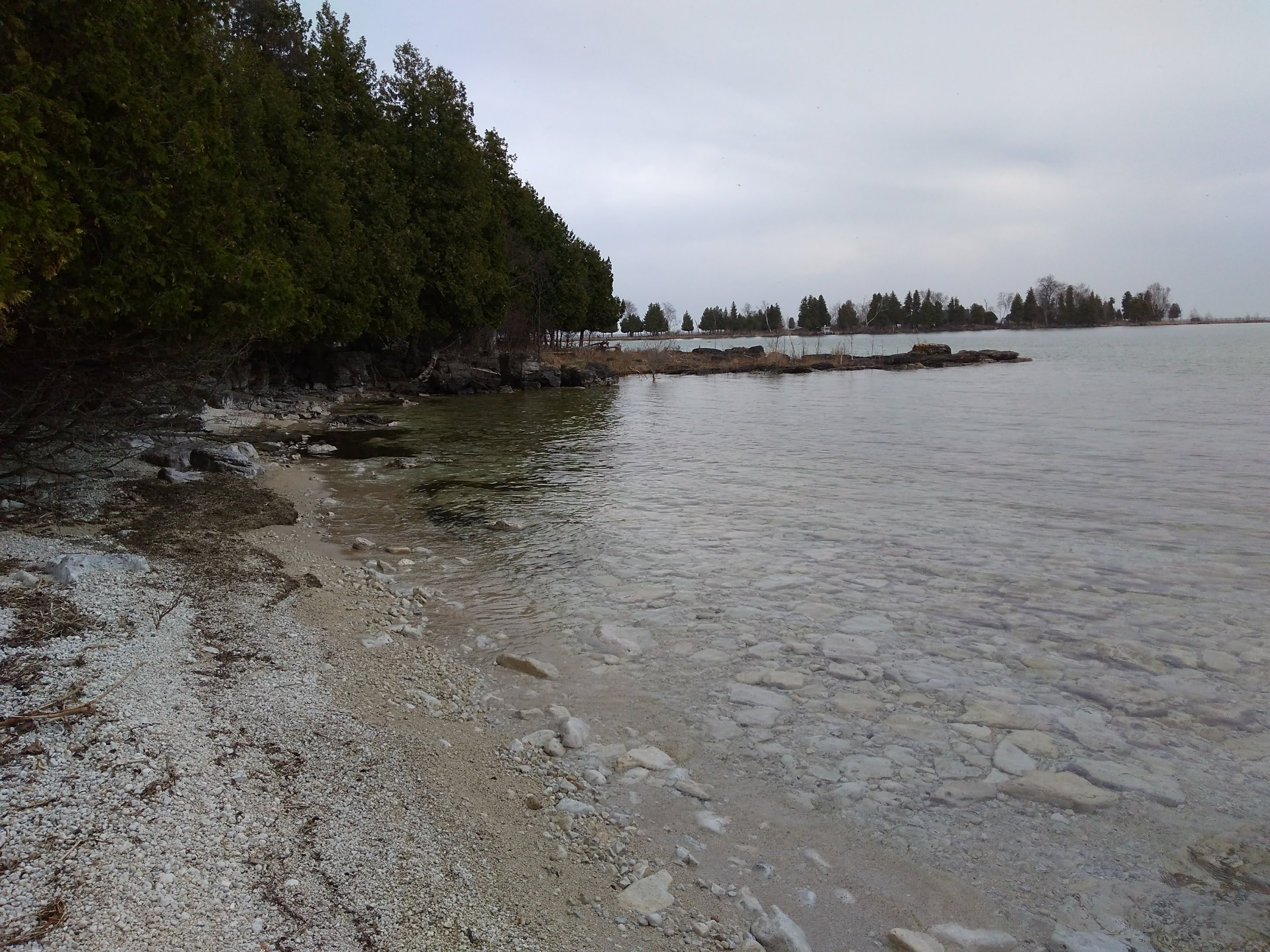
Detroit Island, view of the Green Bay National Wildlife portion

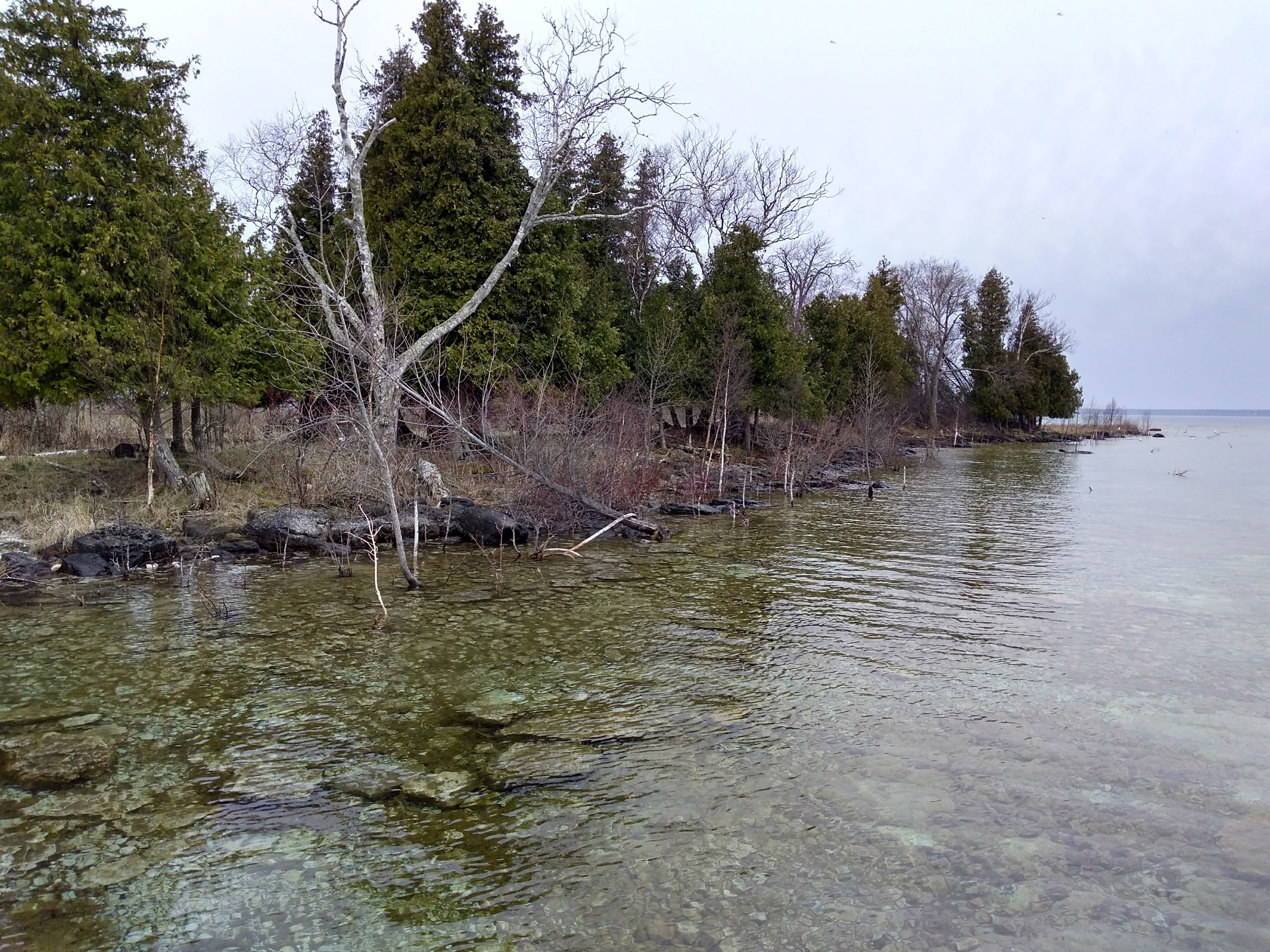
Another view of the Green Bay National Wildlife portion

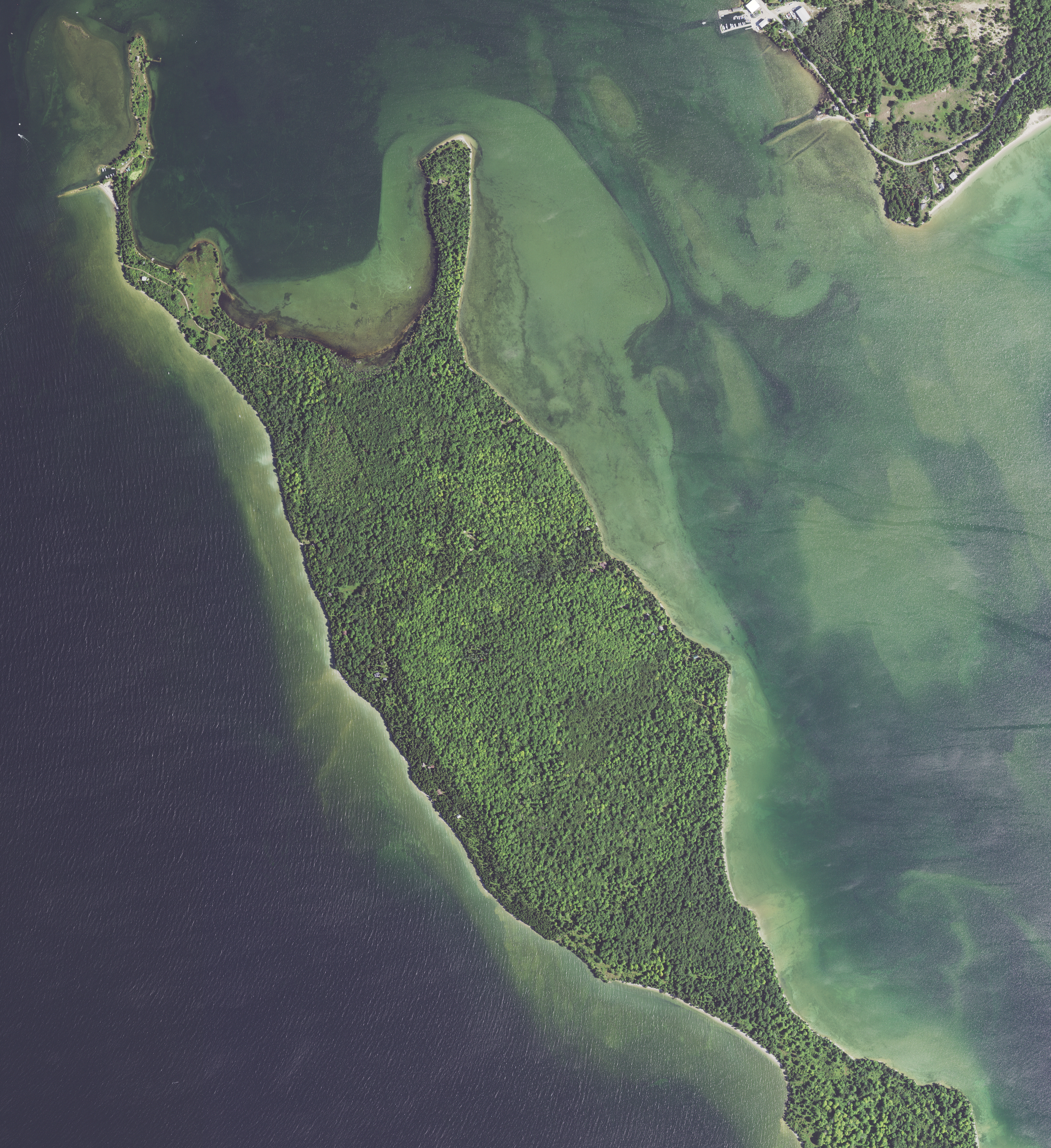
Northwestern and central Detroit Island

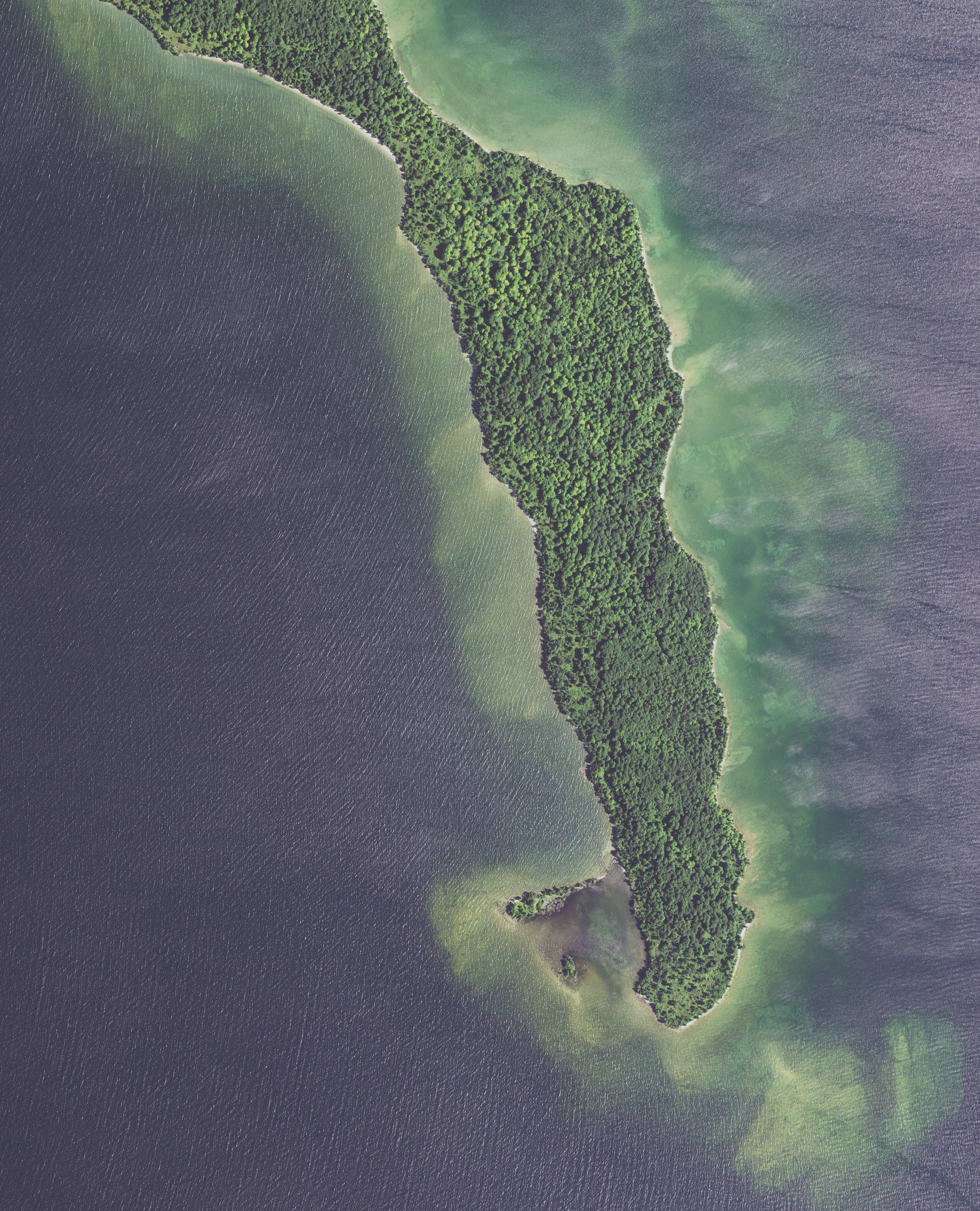
Central and southeastern Detroit Island

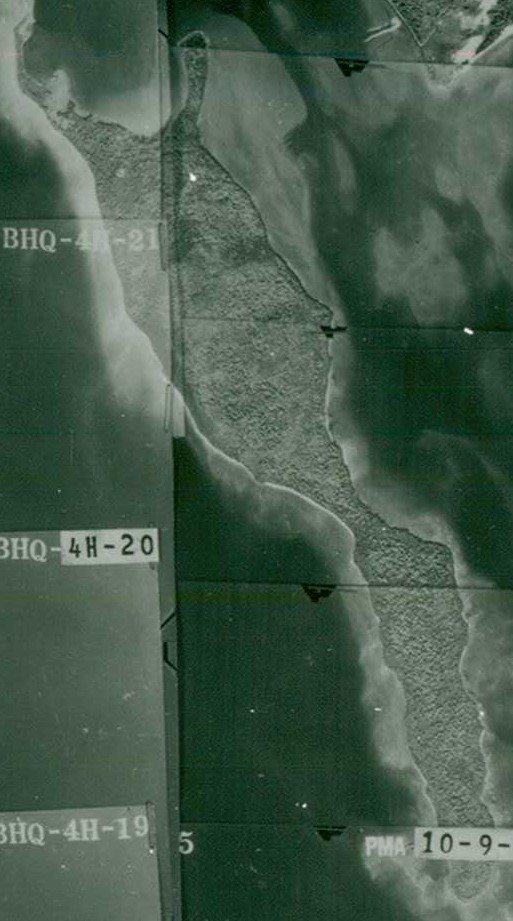
Detroit Island on October 8, 1952

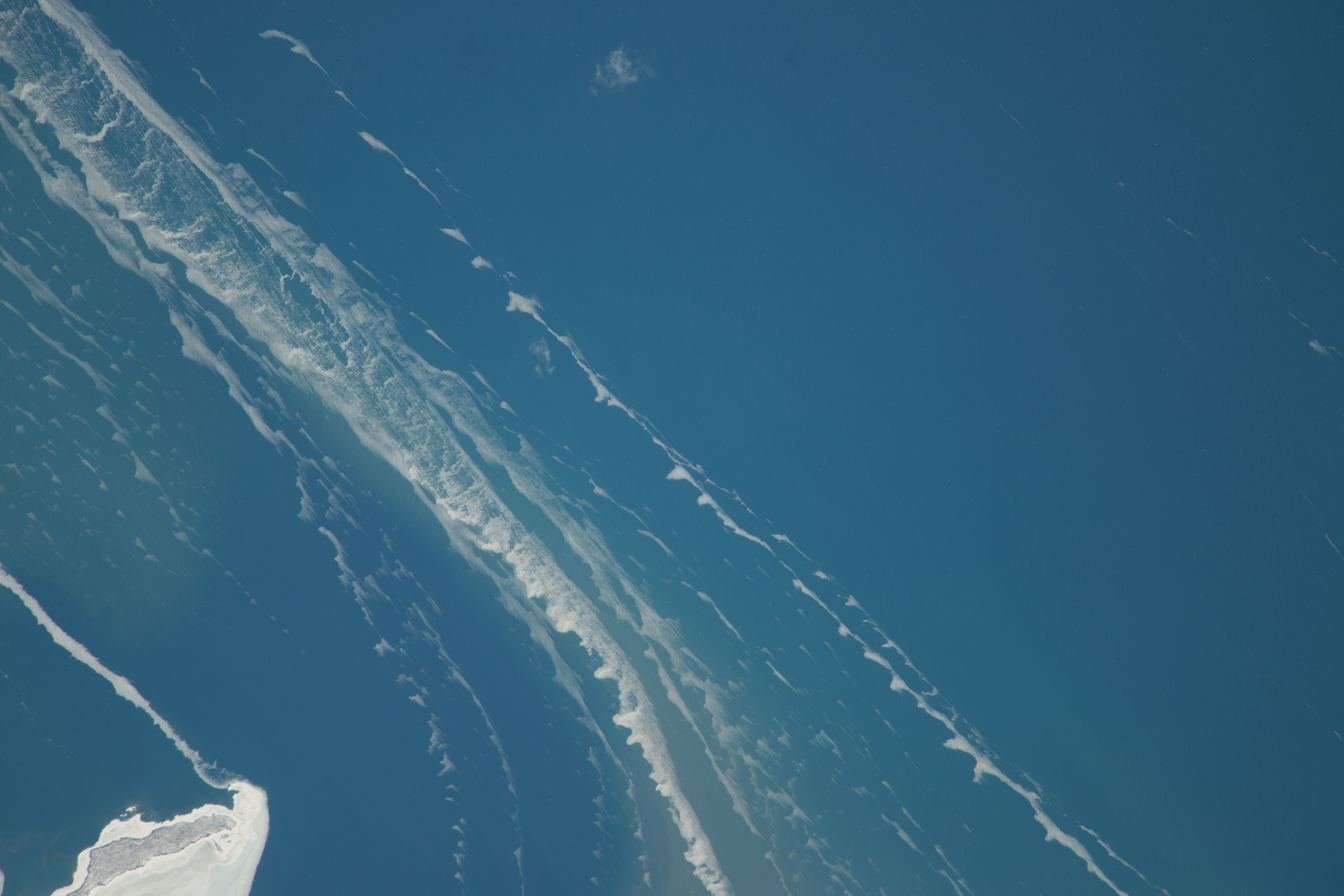
Ice stringers along the southeastern part of the island at 1:52:46 PM Central Standard Time on February 22, 2014. North is towards the left in this photo taken during Expedition 38 of the International Space Station

== Nearby islands ==
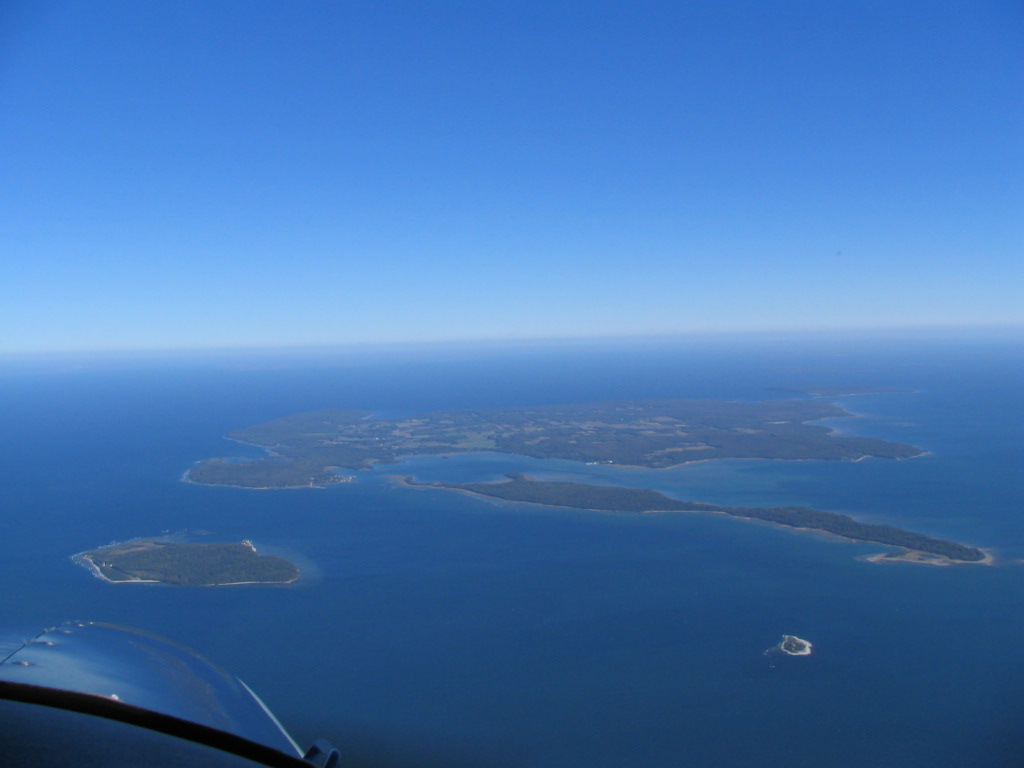
Detroit Island is the long and narrow island at center-right. Beneath Detroit Island on the right is the much smaller Pilot Island, with Plum Island is at the lower left. Washington Island is in the distance.
