= Plum Island (Wisconsin) =

Island in Door County, Wisconsin

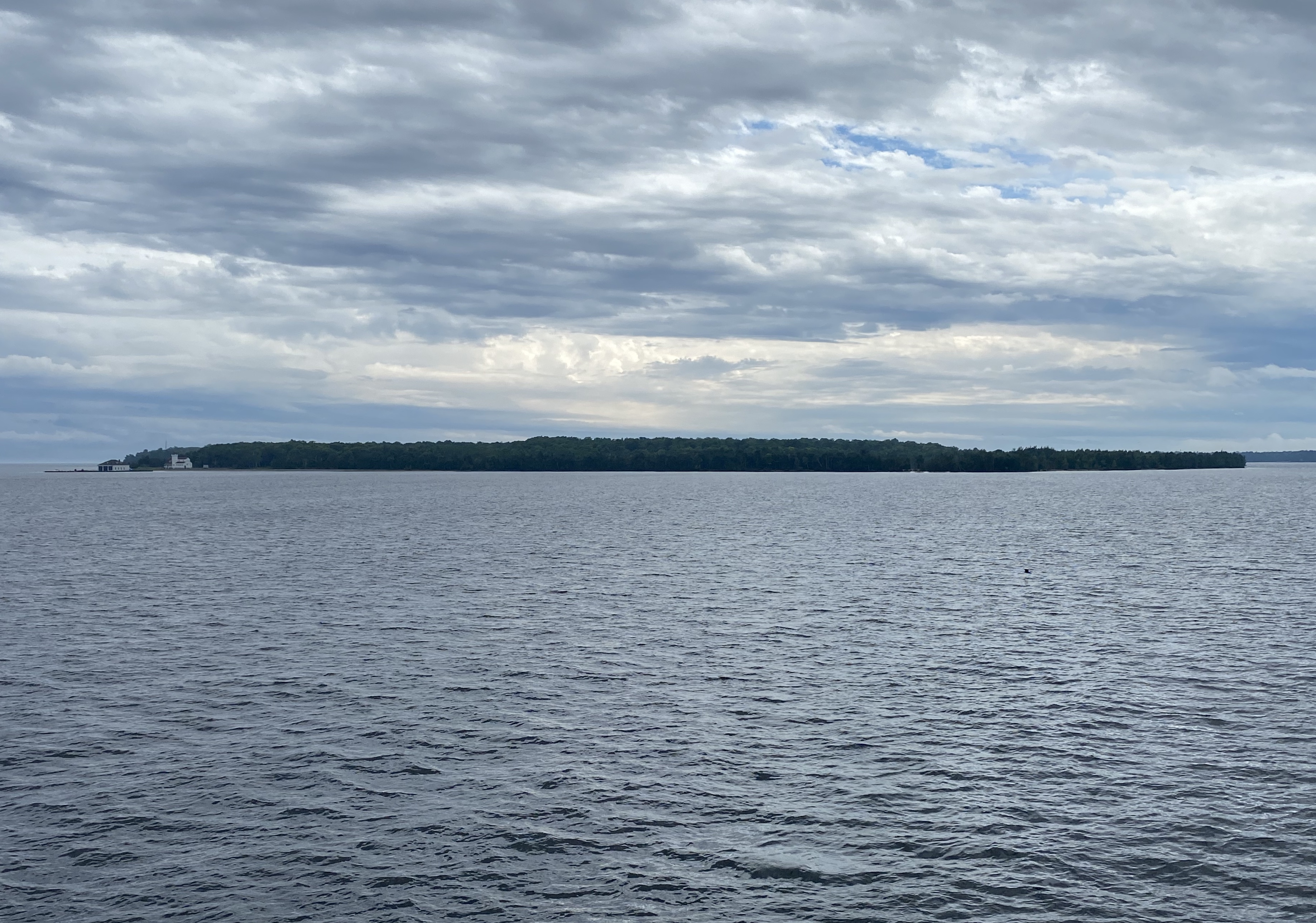

- Location within Wisconsin Location within the United States

Geography
- Location: Door County, Wisconsin
- Coordinates: 45°18′29″N 86°57′11″W
- Area: 0.455 sq mi (1.18 km^{2})
- Highest elevation: 610 ft (186 m)

Administration
- United States
- State: Wisconsin
- County: Door County
- Town: Washington Island

Plum Island is an island in Lake Michigan in the southern part of the town of Washington in Door County, off the tip of the Door Peninsula in the U.S. state of Wisconsin. The uninhabited island has a land area of 1.179 square kilometres (0.455 mi^{2}) or 117.87 hectares (291.3 acres). Carp Lake is located on the northwestern side. During years when Lake Michigan's water levels are high, it is a lagoon of Lake Michigan, but it gets cut off as a separate lake during low-water years.

The island is a bird sanctuary under control of the United States Fish and Wildlife Service and part of the Green Bay National Wildlife Refuge since 2007, and is open to the public for recreational purposes. The island also holds the unmanned Plum Island Range Lights and now-closed Plum Island Lifesaving Station.

== Border Dispute ==
The border between Wisconsin and Michigan was originally defined as "the most usual ship channel" into Green Bay from Lake Michigan, but commercial routes existed both to the north and south of the island, which led to a border dispute. In 1936, the U.S. Supreme Court decision Wisconsin v. Michigan found that Plum and other nearby islands were part of Wisconsin.

== Climate ==
Plum Island

Climate chart (precipitation, max. and min. temperature)
J	F	M	A	M	J	J	A	S	O	N	D
66 −4 −9	60 −8 −10	62 0 −4	112 3 0	86 9 3	77 13 10	96 18 16	73 19 16	109 17 14	119 10 7	110 6 5	66 4 1
- █ Average max. and min. temperatures in °C
- █ Precipitation totals in mm
Imperial conversion
J	F	M	A	M	J	J	A	S	O	N	D
2.6 25 16	2.4 18 14	2.4 32 25	4.4 37 32	3.4 48 37	3 55 50	3.8 64 61	2.9 66 61	4.3 63 57	4.7 50 45	4.3 43 41	2.6 39 34
- █ Average max. and min. temperatures in °F
- █ Precipitation totals in inches

== Lifesaving Station and Range Lights ==
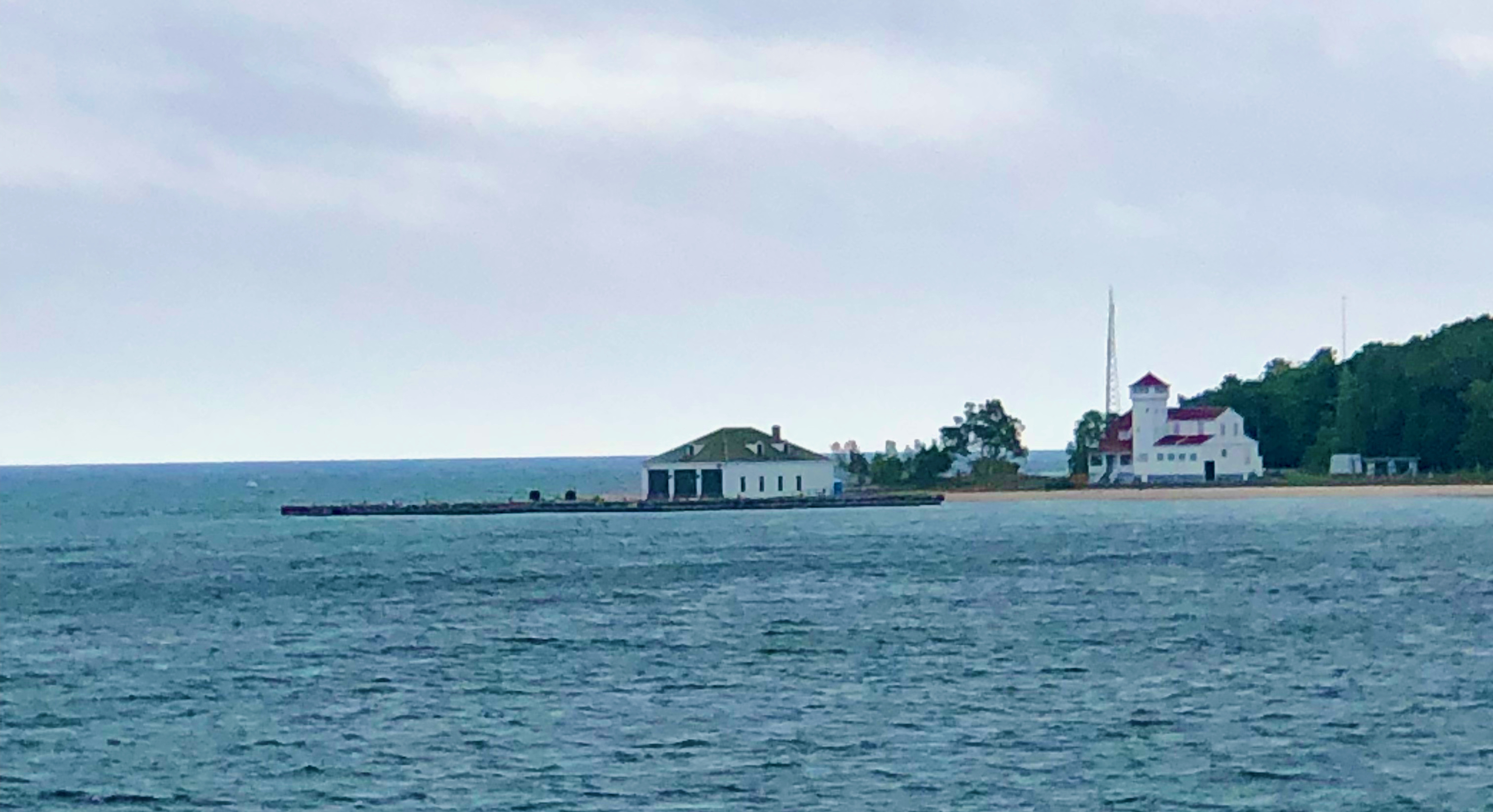
Lifesaving station from Lake Michigan

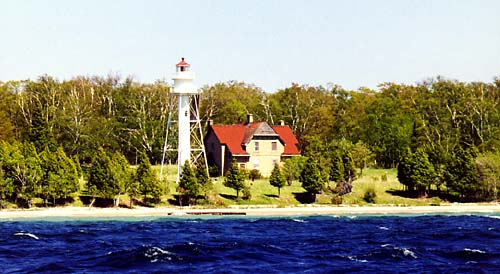
Plum Island Rear Range Light

A lighthouse was built on the island in 1848 and abandoned when it was decided to move it to nearby Pilot Island in 1858. The island was re-colonized in 1895–6, when both a lifesaving station on the northeast corner and a set of range lights on the western side were built. The lifesaving station operated from 1895 to 1991, before being moved to nearby Washington Island, while the range lights were automated in 1969 and remain an active aid to navigation.

== Shipwreck ==
The wreck of the Grape Shot is 0.18 miles (0.29 km) northwest of the lifesaving station in 8 feet (2.4 m) of water. It sank in 1867 after being driven ashore in a gale while carrying a cargo of lumber.

== Nearby islands ==
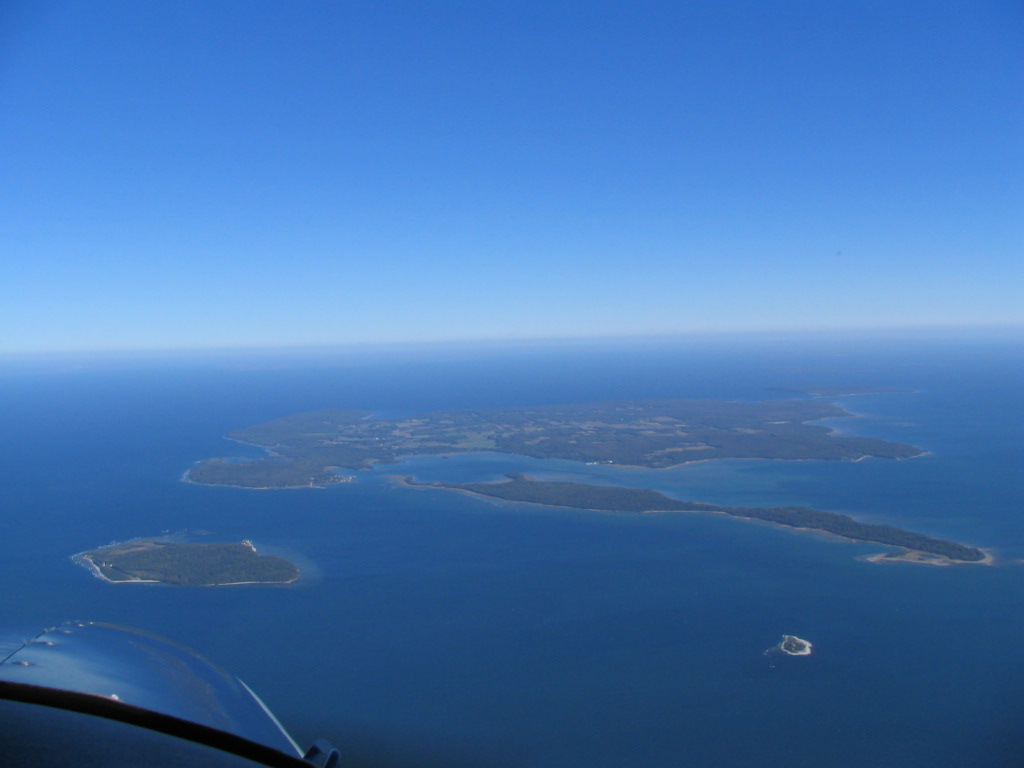
Plum Island is at the lower left. Pilot Island is at the lower right with Detroit Island at center-right and Washington Island in the distance.
