= Grape Shot (shipwreck) =

Shipwreck located off the coast of Plum Island, Wisconsin

- GRAPE SHOT (schooner) Shipwreck
- U.S. National Register of Historic Places
- Location: Off the coast of Plum Island, Wisconsin
- NRHP reference No.: 16000564
- Added to NRHP: August 19, 2016

The Grape Shot is a shipwreck located off the coast of Plum Island, Wisconsin.

== History ==
The Grape Shot was a 130-foot, two masted centerboard schooner. It was built by B. B. Jones in Buffalo, New York in 1855. The vessel primarily transported lumber, wheat and coal in the upper Great Lakes.

In November 1867, the vessel was driven aground by a gale. All crew were successfully rescued. An attempt was made to pull it free by the tug Leviathan. They were unsuccessful, leading the George Dunbar to salvage the cargo of 50,000 board feet of lumber and the ship's rigging and deck gear. The ship then broke up over the winter, preventing further attempts at salvage.

In 1895, a life-saving station was built on the shore of Plum Island nearby.

== Wreck ==
The wreck is located 0.18 miles NW of the now-retired lifesaving station in approximately 8 feet of water. It was surveyed in 2015, and added to the National Register of Historic Places in 2016.
