= Washington Island, Door County, Wisconsin =

Washington Island, Wisconsin
- Town
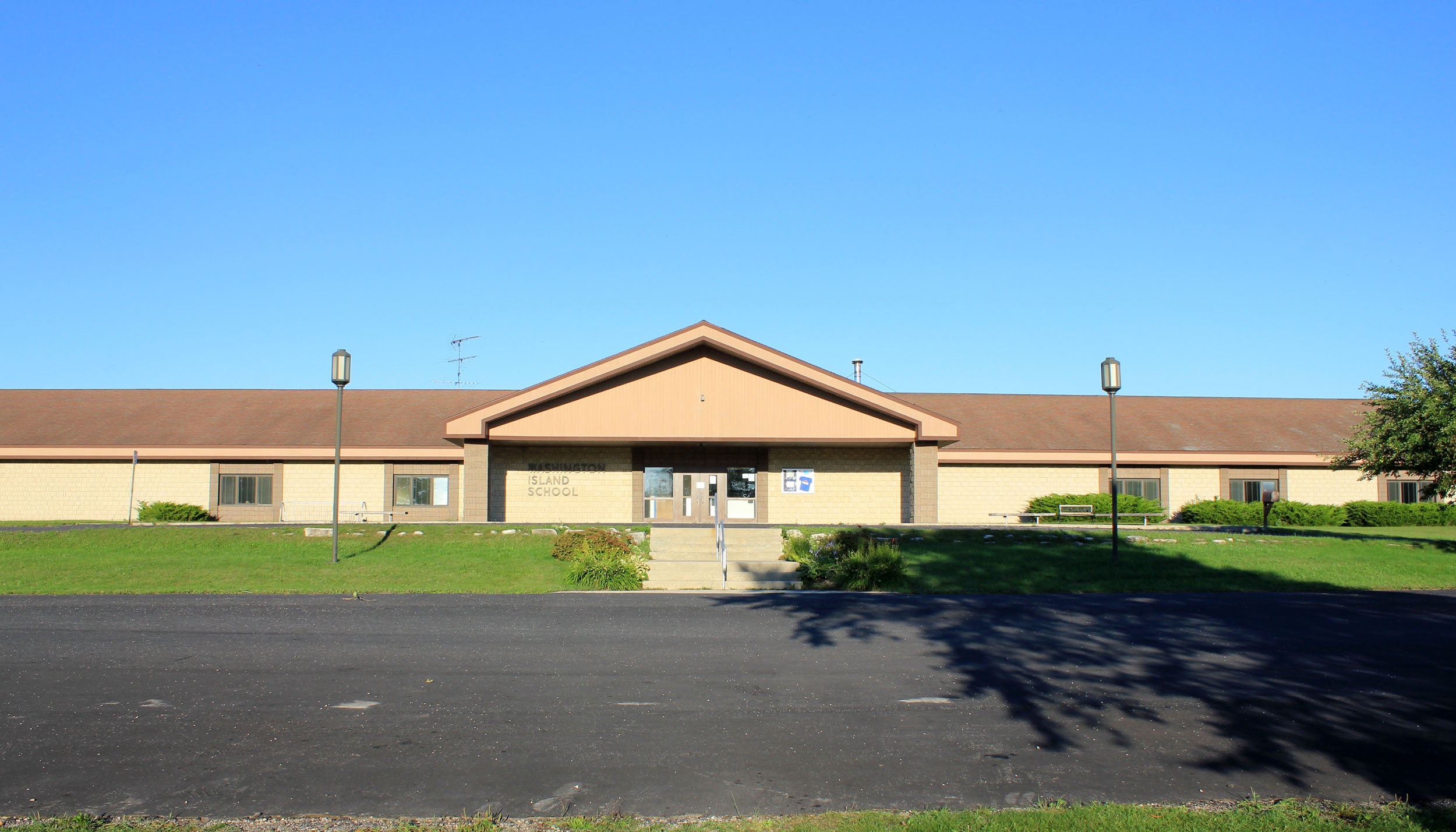
- Washington Island School

- Flag

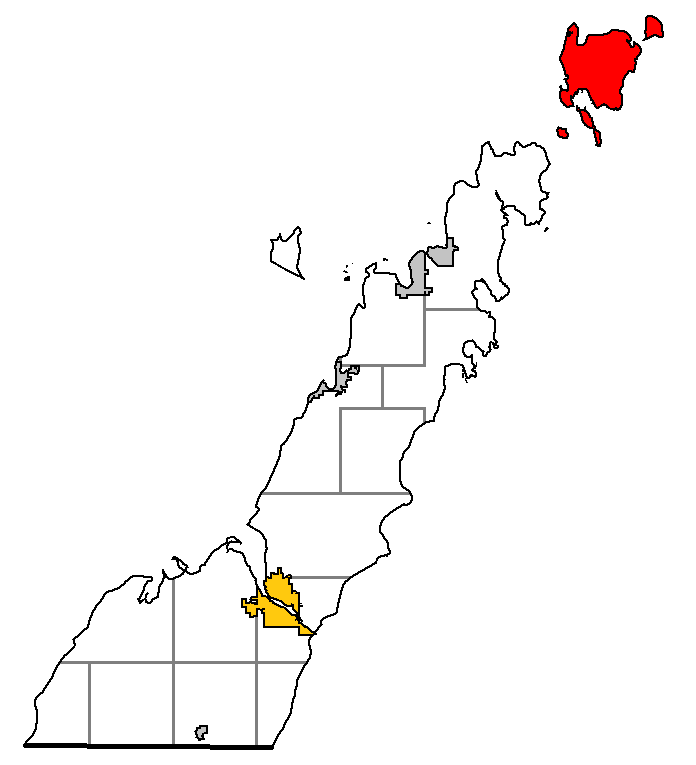
- Location of Washington Island, within Door County
- Coordinates: 45°21′58″N 86°53′58″W
- Country: United States
- State: Wisconsin
- County: Door

Area
  - Total: 125.5 sq mi (325.0 km^{2})
  - Land: 25.5 sq mi (66.0 km^{2})
  - Water: 100.0 sq mi (259.0 km^{2})
- Elevation: 646 ft (197 m)

Population (2020)
  - Total: 777
  - Density: 30.5/sq mi (11.8/km^{2})
- Time zone: UTC-6 (Central (CST))
  - Summer (DST): UTC-5 (CDT)
- Zip code: 54246
- Area code: 920
- FIPS code: 55-83600
- GNIS feature ID: 1584352
- Website: https://www.washingtonisland-wi.gov

Washington Island is a town in northern Door County, Wisconsin, United States, with a population of 777 at the 2020 census. The unincorporated communities of Detroit Harbor and Washington are located in the town.

The town of Washington Island is made up of a group of small islands that includes Plum Island, Detroit Island, Hog Island, Rock Island, Pilot Island, Fish Island, and the largest, Washington Island. The majority of the population of the town lives on Washington Island and many of the other smaller islands are partly or entirely protected areas with no year-round population, if any at all. As a result, the area is rarely if ever referred to as the town of Washington or just Washington; more commonly the names of the individual islands are used as a reference.

Most of the people who settled on Washington Island were Scandinavian immigrants, especially Icelanders. Today, Washington Island is one of the oldest Icelandic communities in the United States and among the largest outside of Iceland itself.

== Geography ==
According to the United States Census Bureau, the town has a total area of 125.5 square miles (325.0 km^{2}), of which 25.5 square miles (66.0 km^{2}) is land and 100.0 square miles (259.0 km^{2}) (79.69%) is water.

The land area is composed of Plum Island, Detroit Island, Washington Island, Hog Island, Pilot Island, Fish Island, and Rock Island. Washington Island is the largest in a chain of islands (which are collectively referred to as the Potawatomi Islands) extending across Lake Michigan between the Door Peninsula in Wisconsin and the Garden Peninsula in Delta County, Michigan. These islands are outcroppings of the Niagara Escarpment.

== Demographics ==
The 2010 US Census lists 708 residents.

In the older 2000 census, there were 660 people, 293 households and 198 families residing in the town. The population density was 25.9 people per square mile (10.0/km^{2}). There were 903 housing units at an average density of 35.4 per square mile (13.7/km^{2}). The racial makeup of the town was 98.79% White, 0.30% Asian, and 0.91% from two or more races. Hispanics or Latinos of any race were 0.15% of the population. 24.9% were of German, 15.3% Norwegian, 12.3% English, 9.1% Danish, 8.8% Irish and 6.1% Icelandic ancestry according to Census 2000.

There were 293 households, out of which 25.3% had children under the age of 18 living with them, 59.0% were married couples living together, 6.1% had a female householder with no husband present, and 32.1% were non-families. 30.4% of all households were made up of individuals, and 17.1% had someone living alone who was 65 years of age or older. The average household size was 2.25 and the average family size was 2.79.

The age distribution was 24.1% under the age of 18, 3.0% from 18 to 24, 17.4% from 25 to 44, 33.9% from 45 to 64, and 21.5% who were 65 years of age or older. The median age was 49 years. For every 100 females, there were 93.5 males. For every 100 females age 18 and over, there were 90.5 males.

The median income for a household in the town was $31,146, and the median income for a family was $45,481. Males had a median income of $30,000 versus $22,500 for females. The per capita income for the town was $17,065. About 4.7% of families and 10.5% of the population were below the poverty line, including 16.3% of those under age 18 and 8.8% of those age 65 or over.

== Transportation ==
Washington Island Airport (2P2) serves the town and surrounding communities. The airport contains two runways and is open year-round There is also a ferry available to travel to Washington Island year-round that departs from Northport.

== Economy ==
Most of the town's economy is based on tourism.
