= Fish Island (Wisconsin) =

Island in Wisconsin, United States

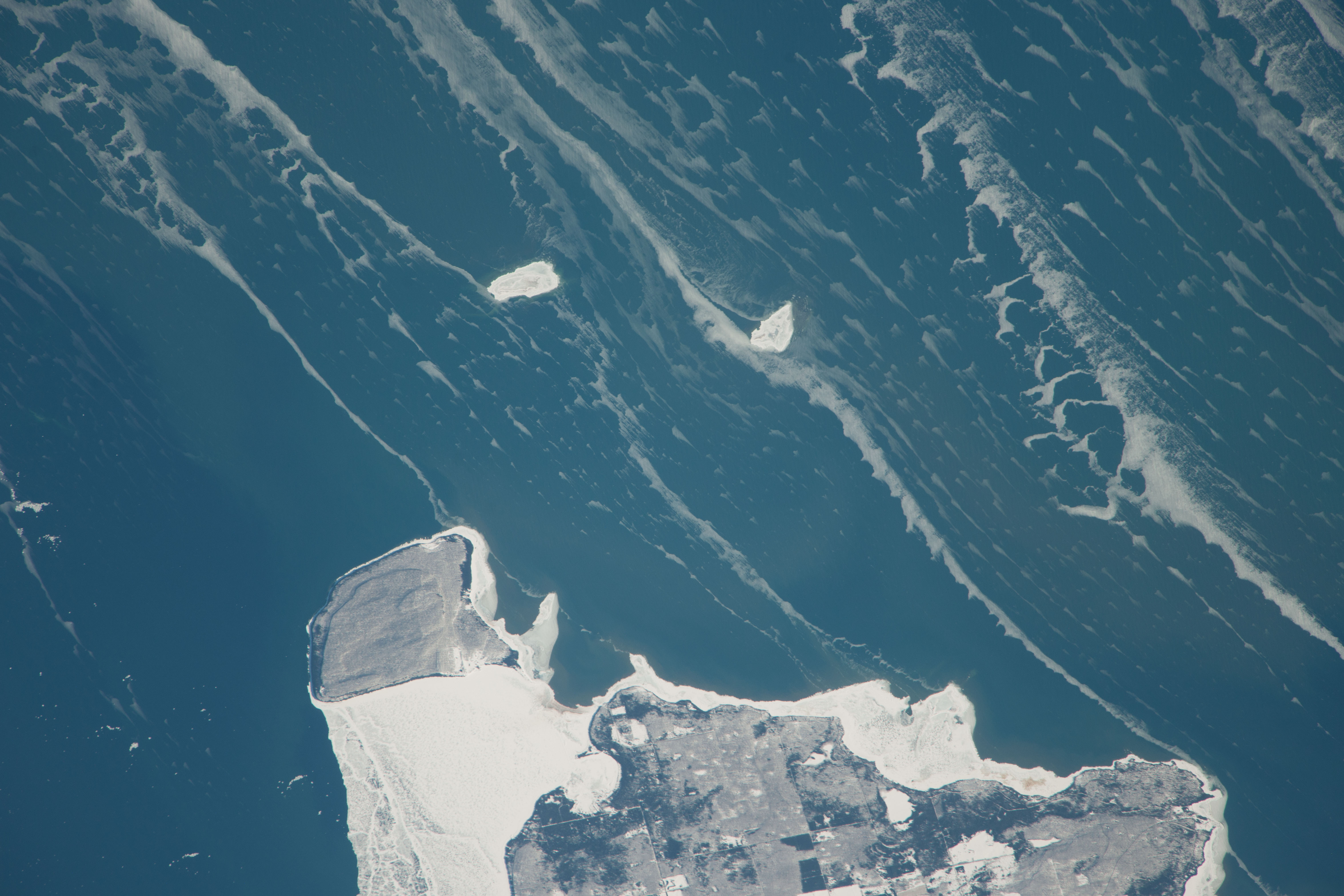
- Image from the International Space Station. Fish Island to the middle left and Fisherman Shoal to the middle right.

- Location within Wisconsin

Geography
- Location: Lake Michigan
- Coordinates: 45°23′40″N 86°45′52″W
- Area: 1.5 acres (0.61 ha)
- Highest elevation: 581 ft (177.1 m)

Administration
- United States
- State: Wisconsin
- County: Door County
- Town: Washington Island

Demographics
- Population: Uninhabited

Fish Island is an island on the western shore of Lake Michigan in the eastern part of the town of Washington in Door County, Wisconsin. It is two miles (3.2 km) southeast of Rock Island and is under the administration of the U.S. Government. It was named Fish Island because of the abundance of trout in the area.

Two miles south west of Fish Island, is Fisherman Shoal. It is a small sand bar that surfaces when the water level is low. It is not much more than a few acres in size, but is a navigation hazard.

== Diagram ==
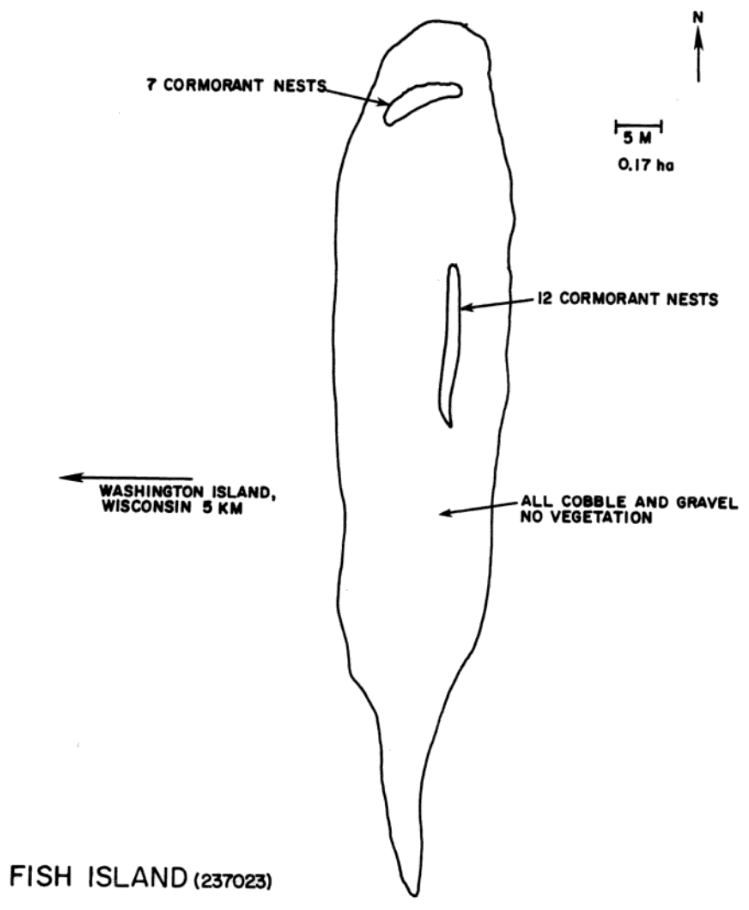
Fish Island, drawn from observations made in 1976

== Gallery ==
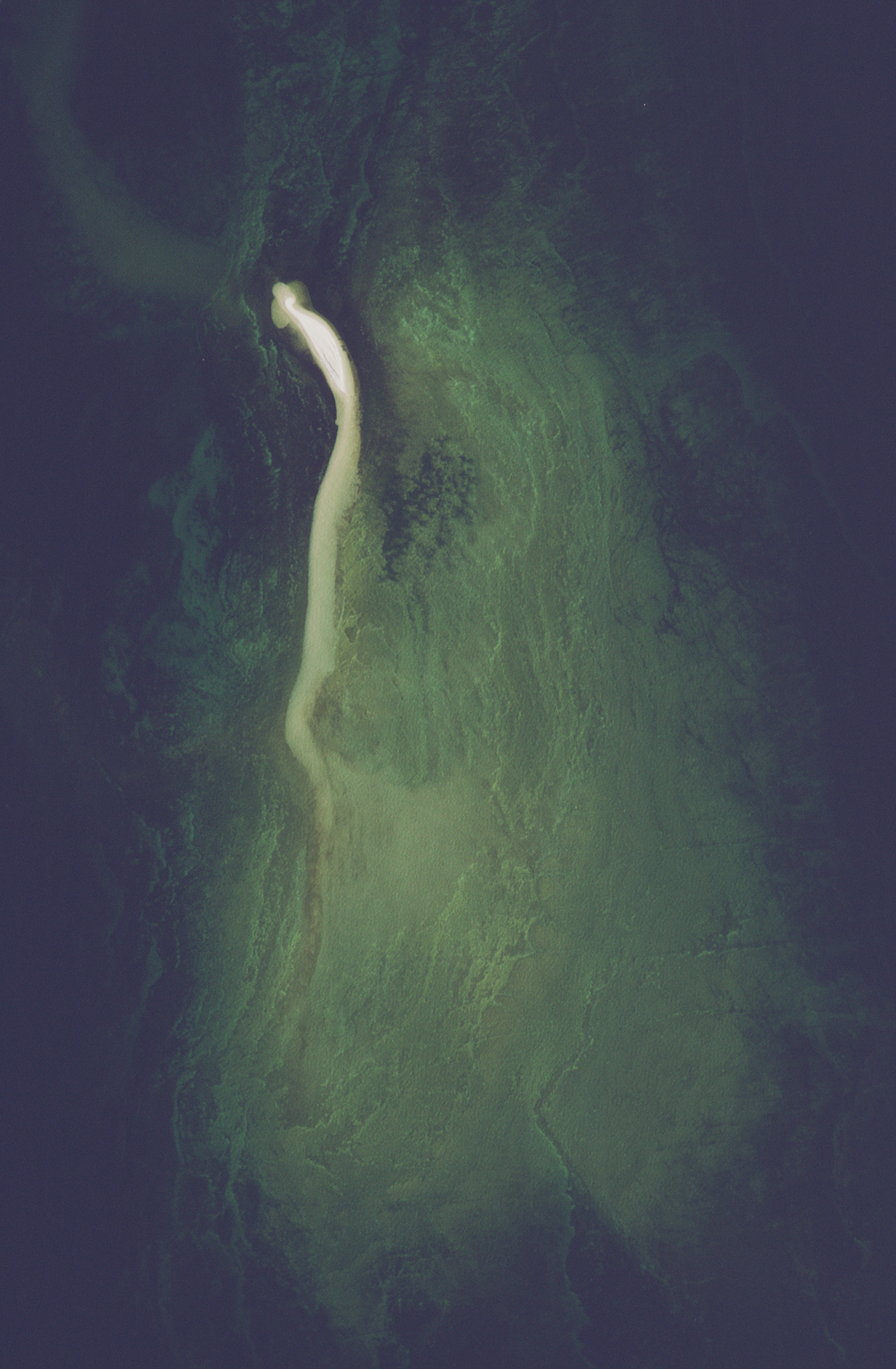
Fish Island on July 28, 2020, taken from the air. During July 2020, Lake Michigan's waters were high, with an average of 177.45 meters above sea level.

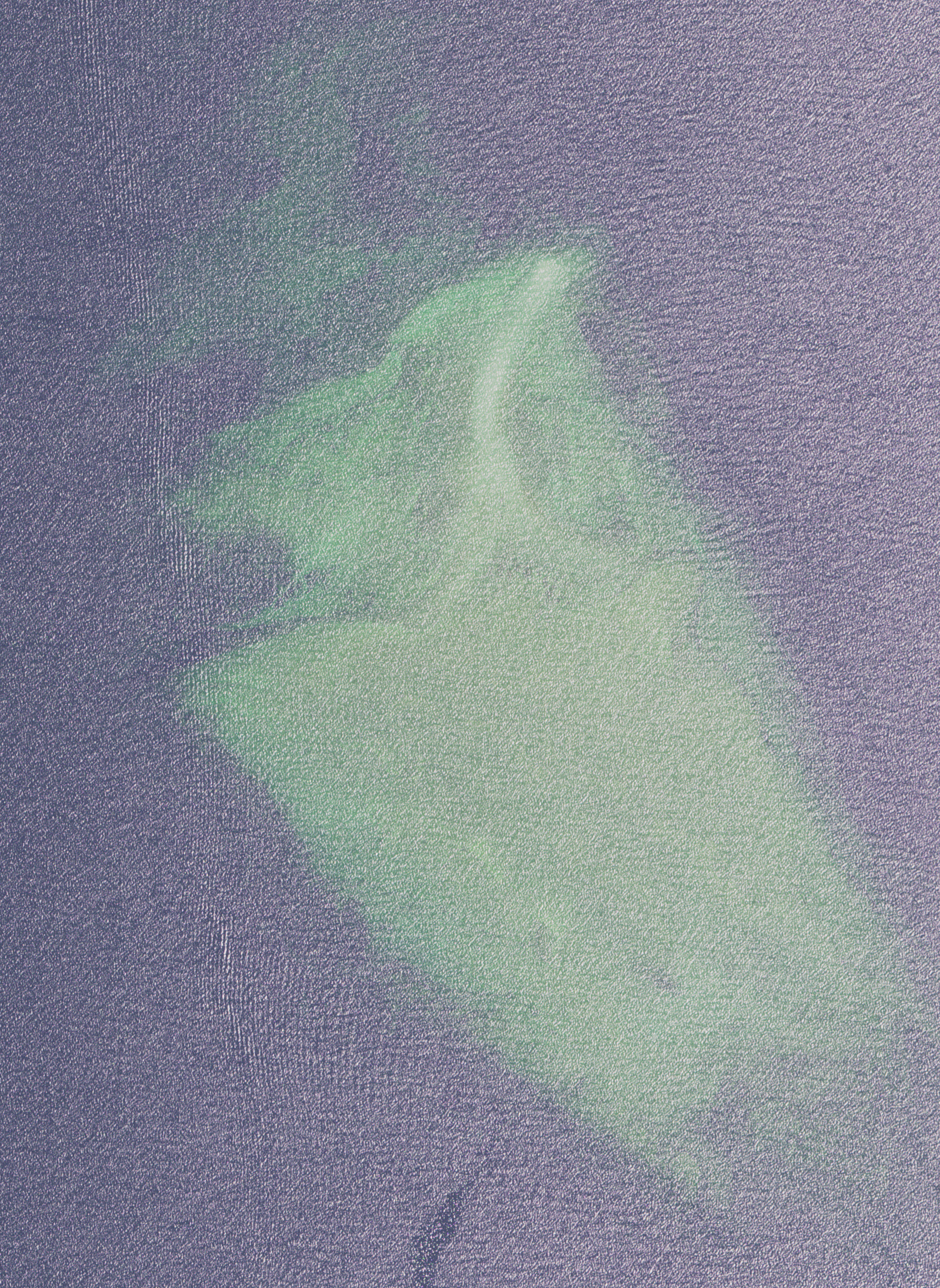
Fisherman Shoal on July 28, 2020

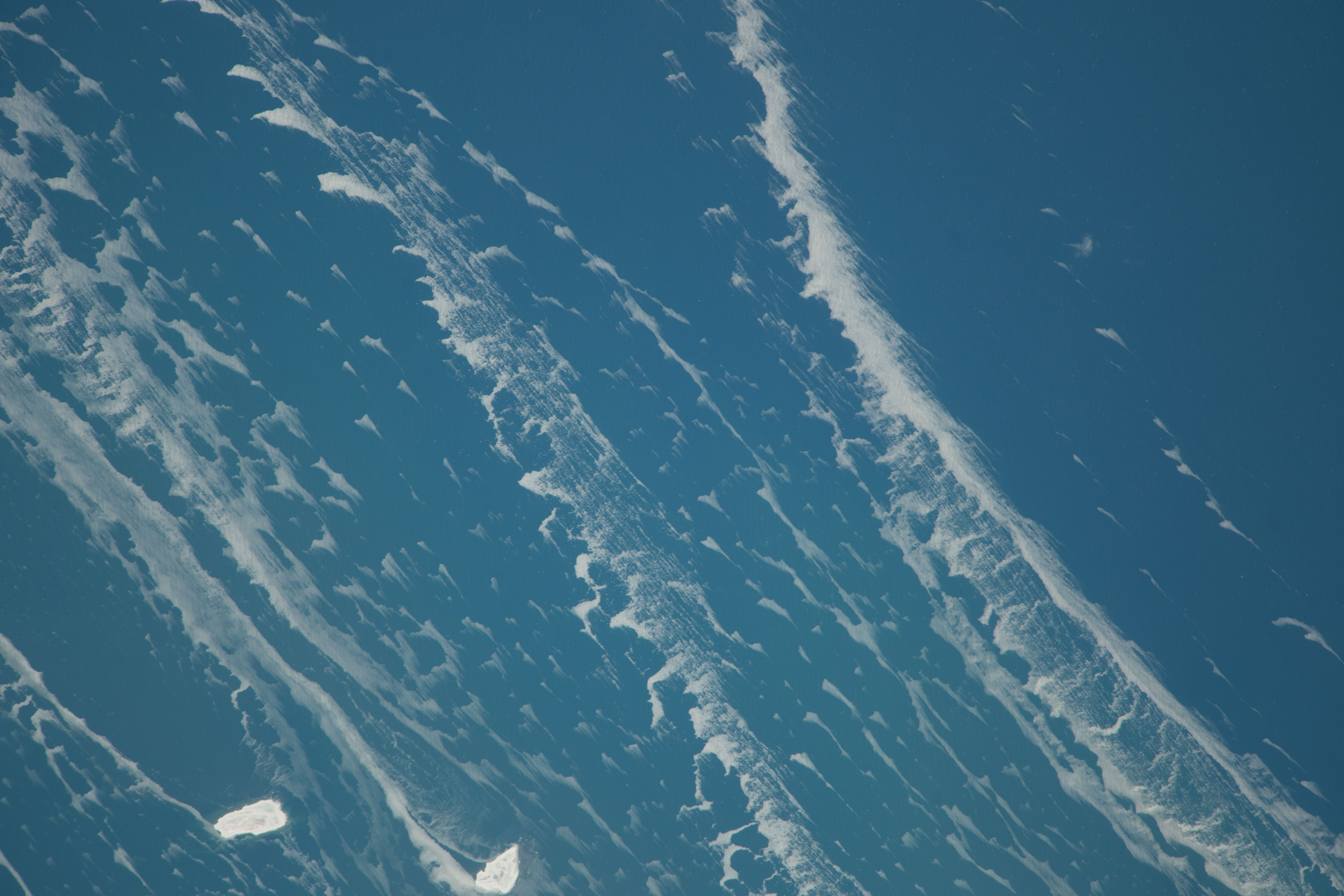
Fish Island (left) and Fisherman Shoal (to the right) on February 22, 2014 with ice stringers; north is oriented to the left. During February 2014, Lake Michigan's waters were lower at 175.95 meters above sea level. Photo taken during Expedition 38 of the International Space Station.
