= National Register of Historic Places listings in Door County, Wisconsin =

Location of Door County in Wisconsin

This is a list of the National Register of Historic Places listings in Door County, Wisconsin. It is intended to provide a comprehensive listing of entries in the National Register of Historic Places that are located in Door County, Wisconsin. The locations of National Register properties for which the latitude and longitude coordinates are included below may be seen in a map.

There are 82 properties and districts listed on the National Register in the county. Another property was once listed but has been removed. Two listings have also been designated as National Historic Landmarks.

This National Park Service list is complete through NPS recent listings posted August 28, 2026.

== Current listings ==
	Name on the Register	Image	Date listed	Location	City or town	Description
1	ADVANCE shipwreck (Barge)		June 10, 2019 (#100004024)	0.1 mi. E. of Sand Bay Peninsula, Sand Bay; 44°51′48″N 87°29′49″W	Nasewaupee vicinity	139-foot 2-masted wooden schooner-barge built in 1871 by Alvin A. Turner in Trenton, Michigan. Hauled lumber from Peshtigo to Chicago, then in 1898 started hauling stone. In 1921, while off-loading 7,000 tons of coal from a stranded steamer, she was caught by the wind and sank.
2	Anderson Dock Historic District	Anderson Dock Historic District	June 11, 1985 (#85001249)	Roughly bounded by Anderson Lane and North Water St. 45°09′43″N 87°10′19″W	Ephraim	Norwegian immigrant Aslag Anderson started a pier here in 1858, from which Ephraim shipped out poles and ships brought in cargo and passengers. Remaining are the store started in 1858, Aslag's house built in 1864, the warehouse, an ice house, and other structures.
3	AUSTRALASIA (wooden bulk carrier) Shipwreck	AUSTRALASIA (wooden bulk carrier) Shipwreck	July 3, 2013 (#13000466)	820 feet southeast of Whitefish Dunes State Park in Lake Michigan; 44°55′20″N 87°11′13″W	Sevastopol	285-foot bulk carrier built in 1884 in Bay City, the largest wooden ship ever built at that time. She hauled salt, wheat, etc from Duluth to Buffalo to Cleveland. On Oct 10, 1896, heading for Milwaukee carrying 2,200 tons of coal, she caught fire off Baileys Harbor and the crew scuttled her in shallow water.
4	Baileys Harbor Range Light	Baileys Harbor Range Light	September 21, 1989 (#89001466)	Roughly Co. Rd. Q, Ridges Rd., and WI 57; 45°04′19″N 87°07′13″W	Baileys Harbor	A pair of lights built in 1869 to show ships a safe channel into Bailey's Harbor. The rear light was also a house for the lightkeeper. Served until 1969.
5	Baileys Harbor Town Hall-McArdle Library	Baileys Harbor Town Hall-McArdle Library	April 21, 2000 (#00000408)	2392 Cty Trunk Highway F 45°03′58″N 87°07′28″W	Baileys Harbor	1937 Colonial revival building clad with local limestone, designed by Two Rivers architect Sylvester Schmitt, and funded by local-boy-become-Chicago-industrialist William McArdle and the WPA. Still serves the community.
6	BOAZ (schooner) Shipwreck		October 10, 2023 (#100009414)	0.5 miles (0.80 km) southeast of the entrance of North Bay, Door County in Lake Michigan; 45°08′21″N 87°03′05″W	Liberty Grove vicinity	The Boaz was built by Amos Stoakes of Sheboygan in 1869 as an 83-foot 3-masted wooden schooner with a single centerboard. It spent its life carrying lumber around southern Lake Michigan. After damage in a squall at Green Bay in 1873, the ship was lengthened to 114 feet. A second centerboard was probably added then. In November 1900, heading to Racine with a load of elm lumber, the ship began leaking in a storm and was towed to North Bay, where it sank.
7	Bohjanen's Door Bluff Pictographs	Bohjanen's Door Bluff Pictographs	September 2, 1993 (#93000881)	Address Restricted	Liberty Grove	Figures of Indians and canoes painted on the rocks 15 or 20 feet above the water.
8	J.B. Bouche House	J.B. Bouche House	May 6, 2004 (#04000411)	9697 School Rd. 44°44′02″N 87°37′15″W	Brussels	Brick front-gabled house started in 1880, with wooden gable-roofed barn.
9	Bullhead Point Historical and Archeological District	Bullhead Point Historical and Archeological District	March 26, 2003 (#03000167)	N. Duluth Ave. 44°50′37″N 87°23′43″W	Sturgeon Bay	Remains of three ships visible in shallow water from shore. All hauled limestone for the Sturgeon Bay Stone Company at the ends of their lives and were burned in 1931. They are the 212-foot steamer Empire State built in 1862, the 134-foot centerboard schooner Oak Leaf, and the 168-foot schooner-barge Ida Corning.
10	Cana Island Lighthouse	Cana Island Lighthouse	November 21, 1976 (#76000201)	NE of Baileys Harbor on E side of Cana Island; 45°05′18″N 87°02′54″W	Baileys Harbor	In 1869 a 65-foot brick tower was built, with a lightkeeper's house and third-order Fresnel lens. A steel skin was added to protect the deteriorating brick in 1902.
11	Cardy Site		April 19, 2010 (#10000197)	322 W Spruce St. 44°49′26″N 87°23′25″W	Sturgeon Bay	Paleo-Indians camped here about 9000 BCE, not far from the retreating last glacier and Lake Algonquin. Date is based on Clovis-like points found at the site.
12	Carnegie Free Library	Carnegie Free Library	December 29, 1988 (#88003069)	354 Michigan St. 44°50′06″N 87°22′32″W	Sturgeon Bay	Carnegie Library designed by Fred Crandell in Classical Revival style, and built in 1912 with exterior of Sturgeon Bay limestone and Bedford stone.
13	Chambers Island Lighthouse	Chambers Island Lighthouse	August 19, 1975 (#75000063)	7 mi. NW of Fish Creek at NW tip of Chambers Island; 45°12′05″N 87°21′50″W	Fish Creek	42-foot brick tower built in 1868 with fourth order Fresnel lens, integrated with light-keeper's dwelling.
14	Church of the Atonement	Church of the Atonement	March 7, 1985 (#85000487)	Fire No. 9410; 45°07′41″N 87°14′58″W	Fish Creek	Oldest remaining church building in Fish Creek, built in 1878 in Carpenter Gothic style with board and batten exterior as an Episcopal mission church.
15	Claflin Point Site		January 18, 2000 (#99001660)	Address Restricted	Gardner	Wreck of a 170-foot wooden vessel next to remains of a crib-and-stone pier in Little Sturgeon Bay, lost under murky circumstances around 1898. It is believed to be a once-fast steamship reduced after burning to a barge for hauling limestone. A.k.a. Claflin Point. A boundary increase was approved March 16, 2006.
16	The Clearing	The Clearing	December 31, 1974 (#74000080)	Off WI 42; 45°15′48″N 87°04′25″W	Ellison Bay	Nature retreat and education center founded in 1935 by Danish immigrant and landscape architect Jens Jensen.
17	Cupola House	Cupola House	July 16, 1979 (#79000073)	7836 Egg Harbor Rd. 45°03′06″N 87°16′48″W	Egg Harbor	Italianate/Gothic Revival house built in 1871 by merchant Levi Thorp, paid for with money he made in the California gold rush of 1849. Now houses shops.
18	August Draize Farmstead	August Draize Farmstead	May 6, 2004 (#04000398)	814 Tru-Way Rd. 44°42′37″N 87°39′01″W	Union	Front-gabled brick farmhouse built in 1880, with outbuildings.
19	Eagle Bluff Lighthouse	Eagle Bluff Lighthouse	October 15, 1970 (#70000032)	3.5 mi. N of Fish Creek on Shore Rd., in Peninsula State Park; 45°09′35″N 87°14′11″W	Fish Creek	Brick lighthouse built in 1868, with a third and a half order Fresnel lens atop a square 44-foot tower.
20	Emiline (schooner) Shipwreck		July 28, 2023 (#100009197)	0.5 miles (0.80 km) southeast of the entrance of the Baileys Harbor marina 45°02′43″N 87°06′09″W	Baileys Harbor	83-foot 2-masted wooden single-centerboard schooner built by Myron Williams of Marysville, Michigan around 1862. In 1864 it was modified for speed, expanded to a 111-foot 3-masted double-centerboard schooner. In 1875 it was damaged in a collision with the Rouse Simmons. In 1896, carrying a load of tamarack tan-bark to the Allen and Sons Tannery in Kenosha, she overturned in a squall. Salvage attempts got her into Bailey's Harbor where she sank just short of rescue.
21	Ephraim Moravian Church	Ephraim Moravian Church	March 27, 1985 (#85000662)	9970 Moravia St. 45°09′17″N 87°10′07″W	Ephraim	First church on the Door Peninsula, begun in 1857 by Moravian evangelist Andreas Iverson. It originally sat near the shore, but was moved up the hill in 1883.
22	Ephraim Village Hall	Ephraim Village Hall	March 27, 1985 (#85000663)	9996 S. Water St. 45°09′22″N 87°10′16″W	Ephraim	Community hall built in 1927 in Arts and Crafts style, clad in limestone from Eagle Bluff. Hosted village meetings, basketball, a library, fish boils, rummage sales, etc.
23	Joseph Cochrane (shipwreck)		July 17, 2003 (#03000668)	Baileys Harbor; 45°03′23″N 87°05′52″W	Baileys Harbor	131-foot 3-masted wooden schooner built in 1856 by Hosea Rogers at Charlotte, New York to fit through the Welland Canal. In October of 1870 she began leaking while hauling lumber from Cheboygan, Michigan. Despite the crew pumping all night, she hit a reef and the lake quickly dismantled her. Wreck misidentified as that of the Christina Nilsson when listed in 2003; listing corrected in 2026.
24	Joachine J. Falque House	Joachine J. Falque House	May 6, 2004 (#04000407)	1059 County Trunk Highway C 44°43′19″N 87°37′17″W	Brussels	Brick farmhouse built in 1880, with barn. A.k.a. Vlies house.
25	FLEETWING (shipwreck)	FLEETWING (shipwreck)	July 11, 2001 (#01000734)	Garrett Bay; 45°17′15″N 87°02′59″W	Liberty Grove	132-foot two-masted schooner built in 1867 in Manitowoc by Henry Burger. Carried grain, coal and lumber from Chicago to Buffalo. On Sept 26, 1888, heading from Menominee toward Chicago in a gale, she tried to pass through Death's Door, but ran off course and grounded.
26	FRANK O'CONNOR (bulk carrier)	FRANK O'CONNOR (bulk carrier)	July 1, 1994 (#94000656)	2 miles (3.2 km) off Cana Island; 45°06′52″N 87°00′44″W	North Bay	301-foot wooden bulk carrier built in 1892 by James Davidson's shipyard in Bay City. On Sept 29, 1919, heading from Buffalo to Milwaukee hauling 3000 tons of coal, she caught fire and sank off Cana Island.
27	Free Evangelical Lutheran Church-Bethania Scandinavian Evangelical Lutheran Congregation	Free Evangelical Lutheran Church-Bethania Scandinavian Evangelical Lutheran Congregation	March 27, 1985 (#85000664)	3028 Church St. 45°09′20″N 87°10′08″W	Ephraim	Gothic Revival styled church built in 1882 by local Scandinavians, initially independent of any Lutheran denomination to be inclusive. Worship on summer Sundays.
28	Gibraltar District School No. 2	Gibraltar District School No. 2	June 11, 1985 (#85001250)	9988 Moravia St. 45°09′22″N 87°10′07″W	Ephraim	Balloon frame, clapboard-clad schoolhouse started after a school consolidation in 1868. Served as a school for 80 years, and now a museum.
29	Globe Hotel	Globe Hotel	January 28, 1982 (#82000663)	8090 Main St. 45°03′47″N 87°07′26″W	Baileys Harbor	Greek Revival building started in 1867. Served as a hotel from 1874 to 1886, run by Roger Eatough, early businessman and politician.
30	GRAPE SHOT (schooner) Shipwreck		August 19, 2016 (#16000564)	0.2 miles (0.32 km) NW of USCCG Station on Plum Island; 45°19′28″N 86°58′02″W	Washington	130-foot wooden centerboard schooner built in 1855 by B.B. Jones in Buffalo. Hauled lumber, wheat and coal on the upper Great Lakes until November 1867, when a gale drove her aground near Plum Island.
31	GREEN BAY shipwreck (sloop)		November 18, 2009 (#09000952)	In Green Bay, four miles off Sturgeon Bay	Sevastopol	Remains of an unidentified commercial freighting sloop from circa 1840 to 1860 - the only wreck of this type in Wisconsin waters.
32	HANOVER (schooner) Shipwreck		October 5, 2015 (#15000710)	1.75 mi. NW. of Fish Cr. 45°08′48″N 87°16′13″W	Gibraltar	The Hanover was a 109-foot 2-masted schooner constructed in New York in 1853. It hauled bulk cargo (primarily grain) up and down the Great Lakes until 1863, when a gale drove it aground off the Strawberry Islands, where it was stripped and abandoned.
33	Hillside Hotel	Hillside Hotel	March 27, 1985 (#85000665)	9980 S. Water St. 45°09′19″N 87°10′10″W	Ephraim	One of the first hotels in Ephraim, opened around 1900 as the area transitioned from lumber and fishing to tourism. Started by Norwegian immigrant Martin Oleson and his family. Includes wooden hotel, cottages and outbuildings, with one started as early as 1864.
34	IRIS (Shipwreck)		July 19, 2006 (#06000638)	Adjacent of Rock Island Ferry Dock, Jackson Harbor; 45°24′03″N 86°51′12″W	Washington Island	74-foot scow schooner built in 1866 at Port Huron. Abandoned in 1913 after grounding in Jackson Harbor.
35	Jacksonport Wharf Archeological District		February 28, 2012 (#12000053)	Near Lakeside Park off Cty. Rd. V 44°58′43″N 87°11′00″W	Jacksonport	Remains of three old piers started in 1848 for loading shingles and poles into schooners headed for Milwaukee and Chicago. Remains of three schooners lie nearby: the Perry Hannah was wrecked by the Alpena Blow of 1880, the Cecilia wrecked by a storm in 1885, and possibly the Annie Dahl, wrecked by a storm in 1898. Additional documentation and boundary increase July 27, 2015 (#15000478)
36	Jennibel Shipwreck (Schooner)		August 10, 2026 (#100013286)	In Lake Michigan 3.07 miles (4.94 km) southwest of Chambers Island; 45°08′50″N 87°25′17″W	Gibraltar	
37	Jischke's Meat Market	Jischke's Meat Market	September 11, 1986 (#86002306)	414 Maple Dr. 45°11′16″N 87°07′26″W	Sister Bay	Butcher shop built in 1902 by German immigrant Frank Jischke and his family. Some walls are of unusual stovewood construction. A.K.A. "White Apron", "Inn on Maple", and "Roots Inn"
38	Joint Brussels and Garner District School Number One	Joint Brussels and Garner District School Number One	May 6, 2004 (#04000408)	8571 State Trunk Highway 57; 44°45′42″N 87°32′57″W	Brussels	Two-room state-graded school built in 1910 in Neoclassical style with cupola and exterior of rock-faced concrete block. A.k.a. Tornado School.
39	JOYS (Shipwreck)	JOYS (Shipwreck)	November 21, 2007 (#07001218)	500 ft. W of Sunset Park; 44°51′04″N 87°23′21″W	Sturgeon Bay	131-foot wooden steam barge built in 1884 by the Milwaukee Shipyard Company. Hauled lumber, iron and stone. Caught fire in the Sturgeon Bay ship canal in 1898, burned and sank.
40	F. J. King Shipwreck (Schooner)		July 29, 2026 (#100013253)	Address Restricted	Liberty Grove vicinity	144-foot 3-masted wood-hulled canal schooner built in 1867 in Toledo by George R. Rogers - designed specifically to pass through the Welland Canal around Niagara Falls. She hauled goods between the upper lakes and Lake Ontario, and sank in 1886, after springing a leak while hauling iron ore from Escanaba toward Chicago.
41	LAKELAND (steam screw) Shipwreck	LAKELAND (steam screw) Shipwreck	July 7, 2015 (#15000403)	6 mi. E. of Sturgeon Bay Canal; 44°47′34″N 87°11′32″W	Sturgeon Bay	In 1886, the Cambria was built as a bulk freighter and was an early user of steel hull plates and a triple-expansion steam engine. In 1910 it was remodeled into a passenger steamer, and in 1920 into a car carrier. In December 1924, hauling a load of automobiles from Chicago, some of her steel plates buckled in heavy seas, and she eventually went down in 205 feet of water.
42	L. A. Larson & Co. Store	L. A. Larson & Co. Store	June 19, 1985 (#85001357)	306 S. 3rd Ave. 44°49′55″N 87°22′25″W	Sturgeon Bay	Elegant Italianate office built in 1875, with a large cornice atop a Boomtown front. Built by Adolph Larson, who manufactured ornamental woodwork, furniture and coffins. A.k.a. Challoner Morse McBride Law Office.
43	Little Harbor Launch Wreck		April 14, 2025 (#100011640)	Address Restricted	Sevastopol vicinity	Shipwreck of a 29.5-foot gasoline launch probably built between 1890 and 1930 - the only wreck of this type in Wisconsin waters.
44	Little Lake Archeological District		February 27, 2002 (#02000147)	Address Restricted	Washington	Site of Woodland village and burial ground, which has produced artifacts dating back 3000 years.
45	LOUISIANA (Shipwreck)	LOUISIANA (Shipwreck)	March 19, 1992 (#92000104)	Southeast side of Washington Harbor; 45°23′59″N 86°55′22″W	Washington Island	267-foot bulk steamer built in 1887 in Marine City, Michigan. Driven aground at Death's Door in a snowstorm Nov. 2, 1913, while heading for Escanaba to pick up a load of iron ore.
46	Louisiana Street/Seventh Avenue Historic District	Louisiana Street/Seventh Avenue Historic District	September 22, 1983 (#83003372)	Roughly bounded by Louisiana and Kentucky Sts., N. 5th, N. 7th, and N. 8th Aves. 44°50′13″N 87°22′19″W	Sturgeon Bay	Historic district with 28 contributing buildings, including the 1909 Romanesque Revival St. Joseph's church and various homes built from 1890 to 1920.
47	MERIDIAN (schooner) Shipwreck Site		March 21, 1996 (#96000294)	Sister Island Shoals; 45°12′01″N 87°10′10″W	Sister Bay	120-foot schooner built in 1848 at Black River, Ohio. Hauled timber around the Great Lakes for 25 years until October of 1873, when she was driven by a fall storm onto the Sister Islands shoal in Green Bay and wrecked.
48	Joseph Monfils Farmstead	Joseph Monfils Farmstead	May 6, 2004 (#04000409)	1463 Dump Rd. 44°44′29″N 87°34′50″W	Brussels	Farm built around 1921, with house, 2 barns, silo and shed. A.k.a. Dale Hendrickson house.
49	Murphy Farms Number 1		May 24, 2012 (Apparently listed a second time (same refnum) November 19, 2018) (#12000314)	7195, 7199, 7203, 7207, 7212, & 7213 Horseshoe Bay Rd. 45°01′12″N 87°19′40″W	Egg Harbor	Show farm built 1918 to 1925 by Green Bay millionaires Frank and Eldridge Murphy to show off their Holstein-Friesian cattle breeding project. Includes Dutch Colonial Revival homes and gambrel-roofed barns.
50	Namur Belgian-American District	Namur Belgian-American District	November 6, 1989 (#87002553)	Roughly bounded by CR K, Brussels Rd., Wis. 57, Belgian Dr., and the Green Bay; 44°45′02″N 87°39′58″W	Namur	Rural historic district settled by French-speaking Belgian farmers, consisting of 261 buildings built between 1871 and 1930, including farmsteads, homes, the 1891 St. Mary of the Snows Catholic Church, the 1910 Fairland School, and the 1916 William Struck store.
51	Alexander Noble House	Alexander Noble House	February 23, 1996 (#96000159)	4167 WI 42; 45°07′39″N 87°14′48″W	Fish Creek	The first home in Fish Creek fancier than a log cabin, built 1868 or 1875. Noble was a blacksmith, farmer, postmaster, and town chairman. Today the house is a museum, and the oldest building in town on its original location.
52	OCEAN WAVE (Shipwreck)	OCEAN WAVE (Shipwreck)	July 19, 2006 (#06000639)	2 mi. off Whitefish Point; 44°53′07″N 87°09′08″W	Lake Michigan	Woodean scow schooner built 1860 at Harrison's Island, Michigan. Sank in a storm September 23, 1869, hauling limestone.
53	PEORIA Shipwreck (Schooner)		April 5, 2024 (#100010152)	0.15 miles (0.24 km) northeast of the Baileys Harbor Marina entrance, in Baileys Harbor, Lake Michigan; 45°03′53″N 87°07′08″W	Baileys Harbor vicinity	112-foot wood-hulled two-masted schooner built in 1854 by Alanson Gilmore at Black River, Ohio. Hauled grain, lumber and other bulk cargo around the Great Lakes. In November 1901, while hauling lumber from East Jordan, Michigan to Chicago, a storm forced her to shelter in Baileys Harbor, where the storm drove her onto the beach.
54	Peter Peterson House	Peter Peterson House	March 27, 1985 (#85000666)	10020 N. Water St. 45°09′28″N 87°10′14″W	Ephraim	Norwegian immigrant Peterson was storekeeper, town chairman, justice of the peace, and founder of the congregation that would become Bethany Lutheran. The 1874 house was used as a parsonage after Peterson returned to Norway in 1883.
55	Pilot Island Light	Pilot Island Light	November 21, 1983 (#83004279)	Portes des Norts Passage, Pilot Island; 45°17′03″N 86°55′10″W	Gills Rock	Brick lightkeeper's house built in 1858 with a 41-foot tower on top, on an island at the east end of Death's Door. Regular heavy fogs in the area prompted addition of Daboll's trumpets foghorns in 1864, with later upgrades.
56	Pilot Island NW Site	Pilot Island NW Site	March 19, 1992 (#92000103)	Address Restricted	Washington	Wrecks of three wooden ships commingled on the reef SW of the island: the 115-foot scow-schooner Forest built in 1857 and wrecked by a storm in October of 1891, the 147-foot schooner A. P. Nichols built in 1861 and wrecked by a storm in October of 1892, and the 138-foot canaller-schooner J. E. Gilmore, built in 1867 and wrecked by another storm only 11 days after the Nichols.
57	Plum Island Life-Saving and Light Stations	Plum Island Life-Saving and Light Stations	June 24, 2010 (#10000385)	Plum Island; 45°18′44″N 86°56′53″W	Washington	The first light to guide ships through Death's Door was built here in 1846, but moved to Pilot Island around 1858. In 1896 a set of range lights was built, with foghorn, keeper's house and a life-saving station.
58	Plum Island Range Rear Light	Plum Island Range Rear Light	July 19, 1984 (#84003659)	Plum Island; 45°18′28″N 86°57′28″W	Gills Rock	One of a pair of range lights built around 1897 so ships could line up on a safe course through the dangerous Death's Door passage. The front light was replaced in 1964.
59	Porte des Morts Site	Porte des Morts Site	March 16, 1976 (#76000058)	Address Restricted	Northport	Prehistoric lakeshore camp along the Porte des Morts strait; occupied by Woodland and Mississippian peoples, the site has produced varied tools and styles of pottery.
60	Potawatomi State Park Observation Tower	Potawatomi State Park Observation Tower	February 5, 2021 (#100006108)	3740 County PD; 44°52′35″N 87°25′41″W	Nasewaupee	75-foot wooden observation tower built in 1931 by the Wisconsin State Conservation Corps - the first purpose-built recreational tower in a Wisconsin state park.
61	Pottawatomie Lighthouse	Pottawatomie Lighthouse	April 20, 1979 (#79000074)	NW Rock Island; 45°25′40″N 86°49′42″W	Rock Island	Keeper's dwelling and light tower, built in 1858 of native limestone on a bluff 137 feet above water level at the tip of the Door Peninsula. Served until 1988. An earlier lighthouse on the site, built 1836-7, was the first lighthouse on Lake Michigan and first in Wisconsin.
62	PRIDE Shipwreck (Schooner)		September 27, 2024 (#100010860)	250 feet (76 m) north of the intersection of W Juniper St and N Lancing Ave in Sturgeon Bay, in the waters of Sturgeon Bay; 44°49′54″N 87°23′12″W	Sturgeon Bay	71-foot wood-hulled 2-masted schooner built in 1866 by Henry Root in Black River, Ohio, initially to haul trade goods around Lake Erie. Later hauled lumber and building stone on Lake Michigan. In August 1898 she was caught in a tornado at Egg Harbor and overturned, with the captain's son lost, then towed to Sturgeon Bay and abandoned.
63	Rock Island Historic District	Rock Island Historic District	May 19, 1972 (#72000050)	Rock Island, off NE tip of Washington Island; 45°24′27″N 86°49′21″W	Rock Island	Site of camps of Native Americans, ranging from Middle Woodland around 0 CE to Oneota, to Potawatomi in the 1670s, to Ottawa in the 1760s. The site was designated a National Historic Landmark in 2023.
64	Sherwood Point Light	Sherwood Point Light	July 19, 1984 (#84003663)	Sherwood Point Road on Green Bay; 44°53′34″N 87°25′59″W	Sturgeon Bay	Red brick lightkeeper's dwelling with light tower built in 1883 on a 30-foot bluff at the west entrance to the Sturgeon Bay Ship Canal. A 600-pound fog bell was added in 1892.
65	Dr. Joseph and Olivia Soper House		May 1, 2024 (#100010301)	23 North 5th Avenue; 44°50′09″N 87°22′28″W	Sturgeon Bay	Built in 1881, this is the only remaining residence in Sturgeon Bay that is clad in Frear stone, an early concrete cladding system licensed from Chicago but manufactured locally by Giles Kirtland. The style is Italianate, with window hoods of Frear stone and decorative cross-bracing in the gable ends.
66	Sturgeon Bay Bridge	Sturgeon Bay Bridge	January 17, 2008 (#07001420)	Michigan St. 44°49′55″N 87°22′52″W	Sturgeon Bay	Iron overhead-truss bridge with drawbridge section built in 1931 over Sturgeon Bay to connect the two halves of Door County.
67	Sturgeon Bay Canal Light	Sturgeon Bay Canal Light	July 19, 1984 (#84003666)	Sturgeon Bay Canal; 44°47′42″N 87°18′46″W	Sturgeon Bay	Light on a 98-foot steel tower, initially built in 1898 and finally stabilized in 1903.
68	Sturgeon Bay Post Office	Sturgeon Bay Post Office	October 24, 2000 (#00001237)	359 Louisiana Ave. 44°50′07″N 87°22′33″W	Sturgeon Bay	Brick and limestone building designed in Art Moderne style under Louis A. Simon and built in 1937, with mural inside.
69	Success (shipwreck)		October 5, 2015 (#15000711)	.13 mi. SW. of Whitefish Dunes State Park; 44°54′59″N 87°12′10″W	Sevastopol	151-ton 2-masted scow schooner built in 1875 in Manitowoc. Hauled lumber on Lake Michigan until November 1896, when she was pushed aground by a storm while loading in Whitefish Bay. Still quite intact, with wire rigging, deadeyes, bilge pump and centerboard present.
70	Sunshine Shipwreck (Scow Schooner)		October 30, 2023 (#100009481)	1.1 miles (1.8 km) southeast of the entrance of North Bay, Door County in Lake Michigan; 45°08′26″N 87°04′14″W	Liberty Grove vicinity	Wooden scow schooner built by Jerry Dupree in Detroit in 1856. Mostly carried lumber from northern Michigan to Wisconsin and Illinois. Driven ashore by a gale in September 1869, while heading for Chicago with a load of lumber.
71	Teweles and Brandeis Grain Elevator	Teweles and Brandeis Grain Elevator	February 5, 2018 (#100002091)	92 E Maple St. 44°49′44″N 87°22′58″W	Sturgeon Bay	Grain processing and storage building built in 1901.
72	Third Avenue Historic District	Third Avenue Historic District	October 6, 1983 (#83004282)	Roughly bounded by Kentucky St., N. 2nd, N. 3rd, and S. 3rd Aves. 44°50′05″N 87°22′36″W	Sturgeon Bay	Mixed business and residential district including the 1872 John Masse Hardware-Tin Shop, the Queen Anne Wegener Business Block built in the 1880s and 1890s, the 1906 Neoclassical Merchant's Exchange Bank, and the 1935 Art Moderne George Draeb Jewelry Store.
73	Thordarson Estate Historic District	Thordarson Estate Historic District	March 21, 1985 (#85000641)	Rock Island State Park; 45°24′39″N 86°49′43″W	Rock Island	Island estate of Chester Thordarson, Icelandic immigrant, Chicago electrical inventor, businessman, and book collector. Remaining buildings are rustic limestone and wood-frame, built from 1910 to 1935, some designed by Frederick Dinkelberg.
74	Freeman and Jesse Thorp House and Cottages	Freeman and Jesse Thorp House and Cottages	August 15, 1997 (#97000887)	4135 Bluff Street; 45°07′36″N 87°14′40″W	Fish Creek	Queen Anne-style house started in 1902 by boat-builder Freeman Thorpe. After he drowned in Green Bay in 1903, his wife Jesse finished the house and rented out rooms. Six tourist cottages were added in the 1940s. Now a B&B.
75	Louis Vangindertahlen House	Louis Vangindertahlen House	May 6, 2004 (#04000410)	1514 Dump Rd. 44°44′38″N 87°34′47″W	Brussels	1.5-story front-gabled house with concrete walls, built in 1921.
76	Vorous General Store	Vorous General Store	May 9, 1997 (#97000429)	4153 WI 42; 45°07′39″N 87°14′47″W	Fish Creek	Third general store in Fish Creek, built by Levi Vorous in Italianate commercial style in 1895. Later housed a garage and the town post office.
77	Water Tower	Water Tower	March 21, 1985 (#85000640)	Rock Island State Park; 45°24′44″N 86°48′23″W	Rock Island	Rustic limestone water tower of the Thordarson Estate, built in 1929 and probably designed by Puckey and Jenkins.
78	Welcker's Resort Historic District	Welcker's Resort Historic District	April 14, 1997 (#97000328)	Roughly bounded by Cottage Row, Maple, Cedar, and Main Sts. 45°07′42″N 87°14′59″W	Gibraltar	Largely consists of buildings from the resort founded by German immigrant Dr. Herman Welcker in 1907 with a regimen influenced by European health spas of the time, catering initially to Germans from Milwaukee. District includes former cottages of the resort, the current White Gull Inn, and the current Whistling Swan, which was the Lumberman's Hotel in Marinette before Welcker had it hauled across Green Bay on the ice to become his "Casino."
79	Whitefish Dunes-Bay View Site	Whitefish Dunes-Bay View Site	December 28, 1990 (#90001960)	located at Whitefish Dunes State Park; Address Restricted	Sevastopol	Artifacts found in the sand show successive occupations, beginning with the North Bay People around 100 B.C.
80	William Zachow Farmstead	William Zachow Farmstead	January 9, 1997 (#96001578)	9533 WI 57; 45°08′01″N 87°07′57″W	Baileys Harbor	Barn and house built around 1896 by Zachow. Walls of the barn and part of the house are unusual stovewood construction. It was later used as the Alchemy Fields art gallery.
81	Albert Zahn House	Albert Zahn House	May 11, 2000 (#00000492)	8223 WI trunk Hwy. 57; 45°04′15″N 87°07′24″W	Baileys Harbor	Retired farmer Zahn and his wife Louise built the concrete house in 1924, surrounded it with folk art carvings, and named it Bird's Park.
82	August Zahn Blacksmith Shop and House	August Zahn Blacksmith Shop and House	May 5, 2000 (#00000455)	8152 WI trunk 57; 45°04′00″N 87°07′26″W	Baileys Harbor	Blacksmith shop with stovewood walls built in 1905 and house built in 1912. Now the Blacksmith Inn.

== Former listings ==
	Name on the Register	Image	Date listed	Date removed	Location	City or town	Description
1	Frank and Clara Englebert House	Frank and Clara Englebert House	May 6, 2004 (#04000397)	September 29, 2011	9390 Cemetery Rd. 44°44′51″N 87°35′59″W	Brussels	Gambrel-roofed Dutch Colonial Revival house built in 1924. Now demolished, following a lightning strike.

== See also ==
- List of National Historic Landmarks in Wisconsin
- National Register of Historic Places listings in Wisconsin
- Listings in neighboring county: Kewaunee
