= Gibraltar Area Schools =

School district in Wisconsin, US

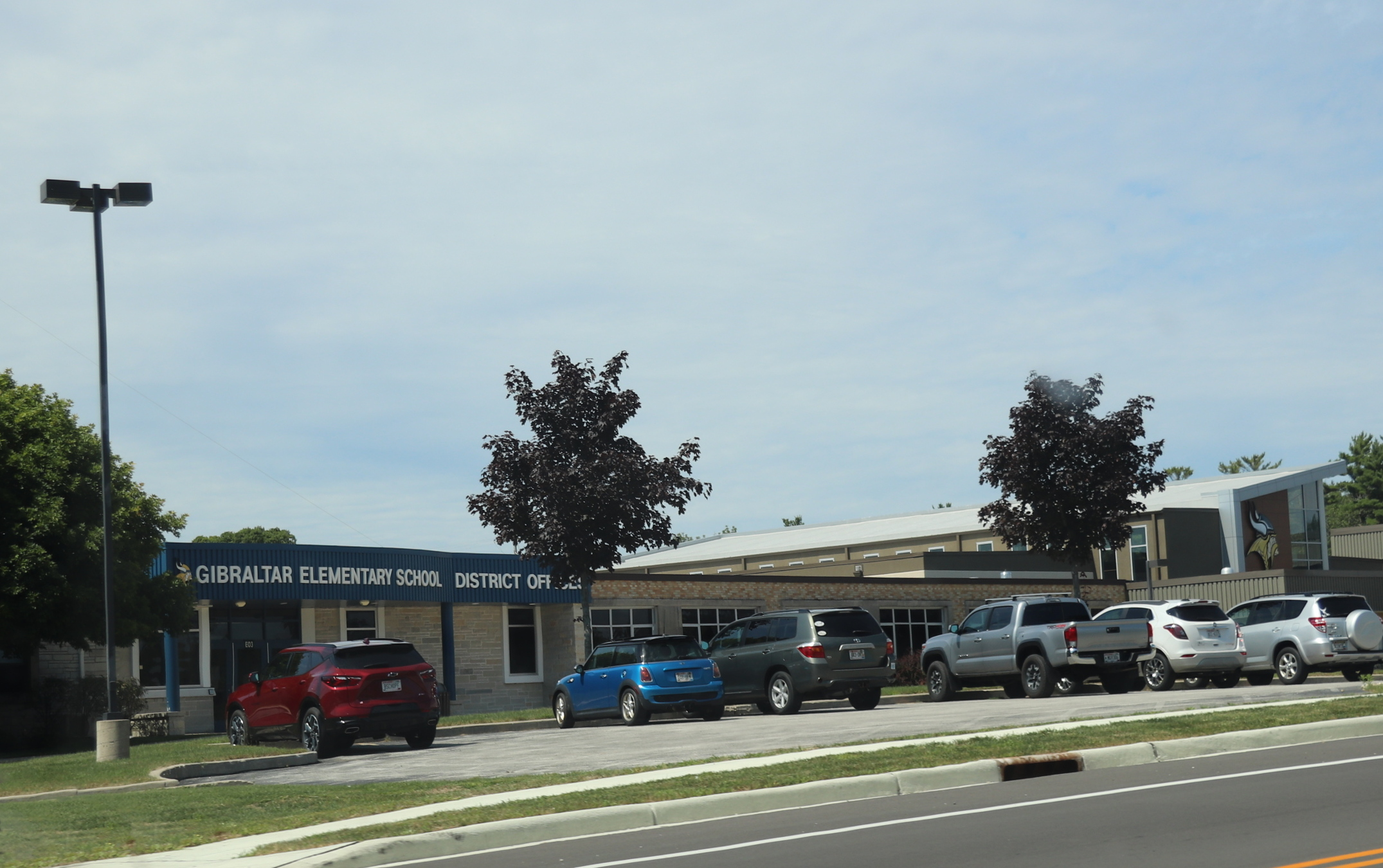
Gibraltar Elementary School and the school district's offices

Gibraltar Area Schools is a school district headquartered in Fish Creek, an unincorporated area in the town of Gibraltar, Wisconsin. It has two schools: Gibraltar Elementary School (K-6) and Gibraltar Secondary School (7-12). It serves communities in northern Door County, including Fish Creek, Baileys Harbor, Ephraim, Egg Harbor, Ellison Bay, Gills Rock, and Sister Bay. As of 2014 about 578 students attend schools in this district.

Previously the district had separate middle and high schools. As of 2005 there were about 625 students.

Gibraltar District School No. 2, in Ephraim, is listed on the National Register of Historic Places.
