= Fleetwing =

Fleetwing may refer to:

- Fleetwing (film), 1928 American film
- Fleetwing (ship, 1865), 19th-century wooden yacht schooner
- Fleetwing (shipwreck), schooner that sank in a storm in 1888
- Fleetwings, an aircraft manufacturing company
- Fairey Fleetwing, a British reconnaissance biplane
