= Welcker's Resort Historic District =

Historic district in Wisconsin, United States

- U.S. National Register of Historic Places
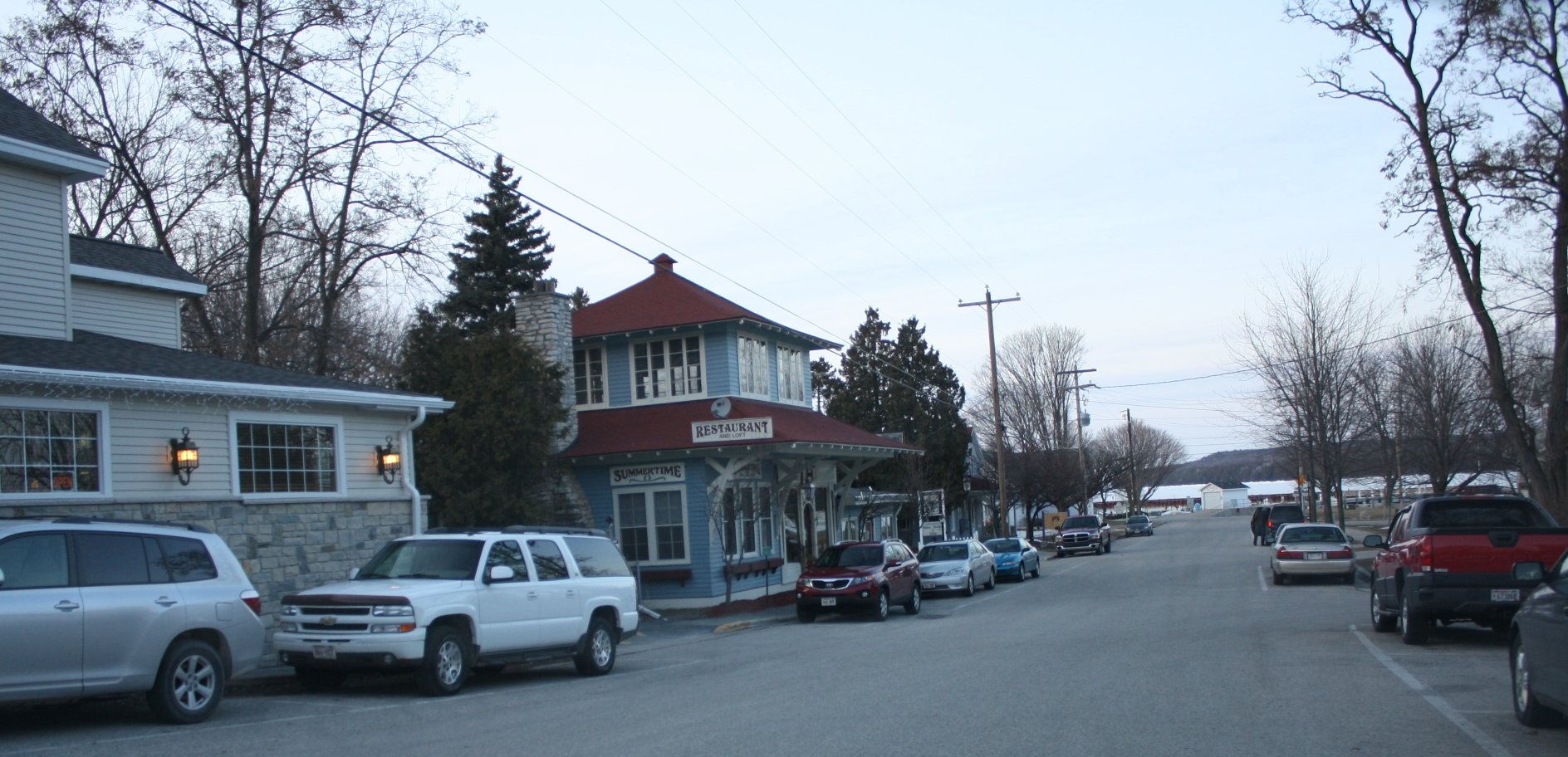
- A portion of the district.
- Location: Roughly bounded by Cottage Row, Maple, Cedar, and Main Sts., Gibraltar, Wisconsin
- Area: 5 acres (2.0 ha)
- NRHP reference No.: 97000328
- Added to NRHP: April 14, 1997

The Welcker's Resort Historic District is located in Gibraltar, Wisconsin, United States.

== History ==
The district largely consists of buildings from the resort founded by German immigrant Dr. Herman Welcker in 1907 with a regimen influenced by European health spas of the time, catering initially to Germans from Milwaukee. District includes former cottages of the resort, the current White Gull Inn, and the current Whistling Swan, which was the Lumberman's Hotel in Marinette before Welcker had it hauled across Green Bay on the ice to become his "Casino."
