= Juddville, Wisconsin =

- Unincorporated community
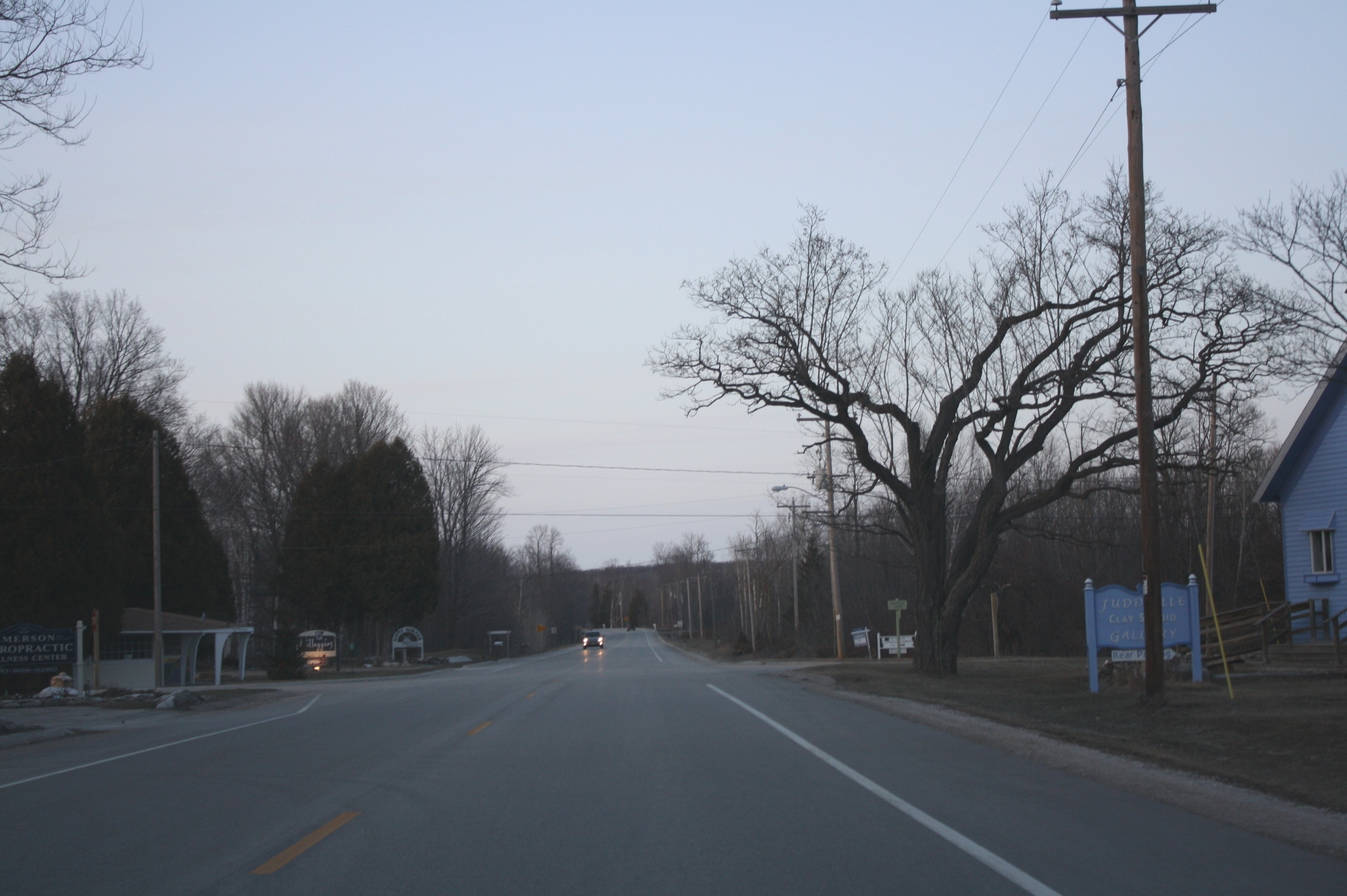
- Looking north in Juddville

- Location within Wisconsin Location within the United States
- Coordinates: 45°05′02″N 87°15′01″W
- Country: United States
- State: Wisconsin
- County: Door
- Time zone: UTC-6 (Central (CST))
  - Summer (DST): UTC-5 (CDT)
- Area code: 920

Juddville is an unincorporated community in the town of Gibraltar, in Door County, Wisconsin, United States. It is located along Wisconsin Highway 42, north of Egg Harbor. Road signs stating "Juddville unincorporated" were erected in 1973 due to local support for marking the area.

== Gallery ==
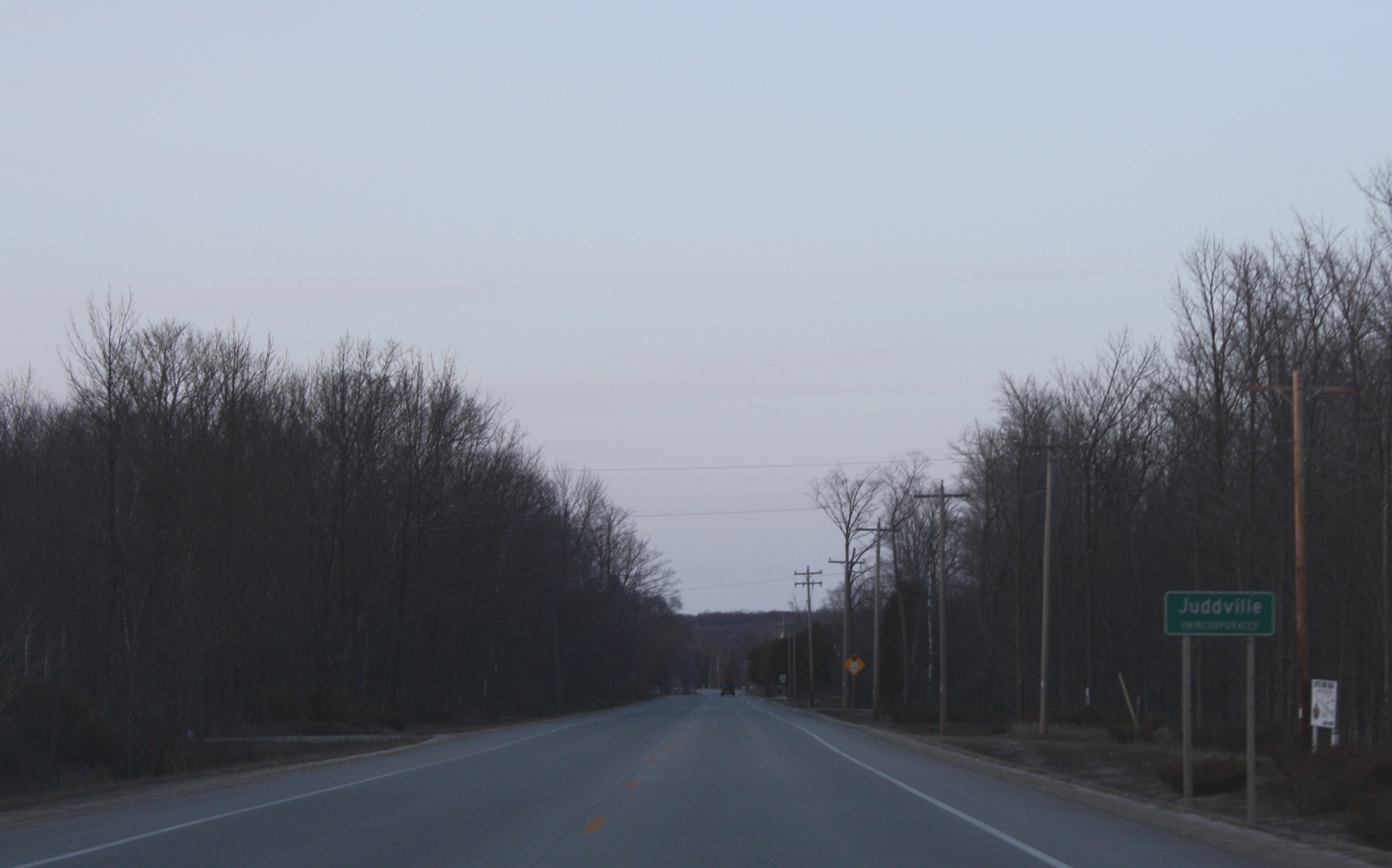
Looking north at the Juddville sign
