= Louis Vangindertahlen House =

Historic house in Wisconsin, United States

- U.S. National Register of Historic Places
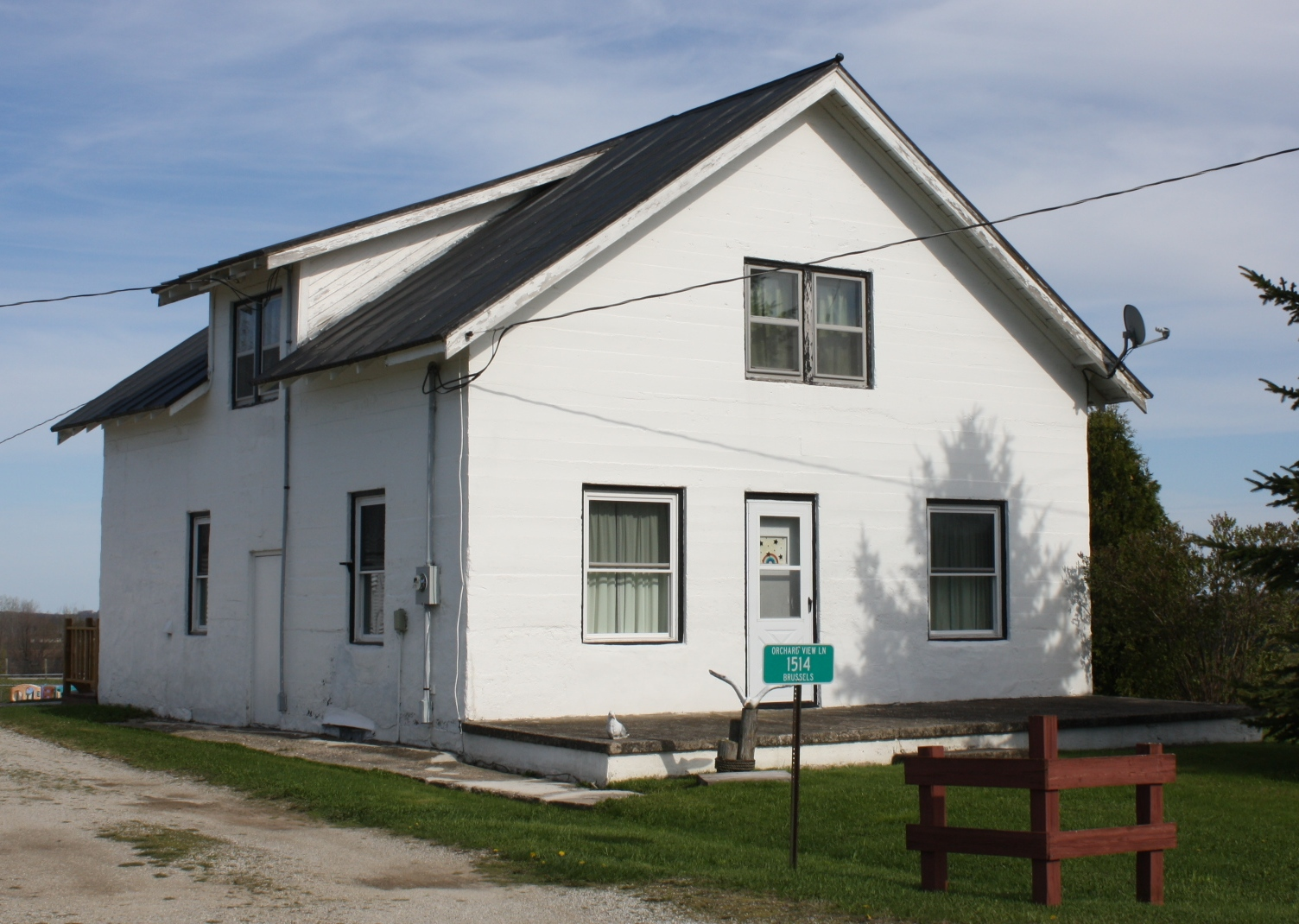
- Louis Vangindertahlen House
- Location: 1514 Dump Rd., Brussels, Wisconsin
- Coordinates: 44°44′38″N 87°34′47″W
- Area: less than one acre
- Built: 1921
- Architect: Joseph Cumber
- Architectural style: Late 19th and Early 20th Century American Movements
- NRHP reference No.: 04000410
- Added to NRHP: May 6, 2004

The Louis Vangindertahlen House is a historic house located in Brussels, Wisconsin. It was added to the State and the National Register of Historic Places in 2004.
