= Gibraltar District School No. 2 =

- U.S. National Register of Historic Places
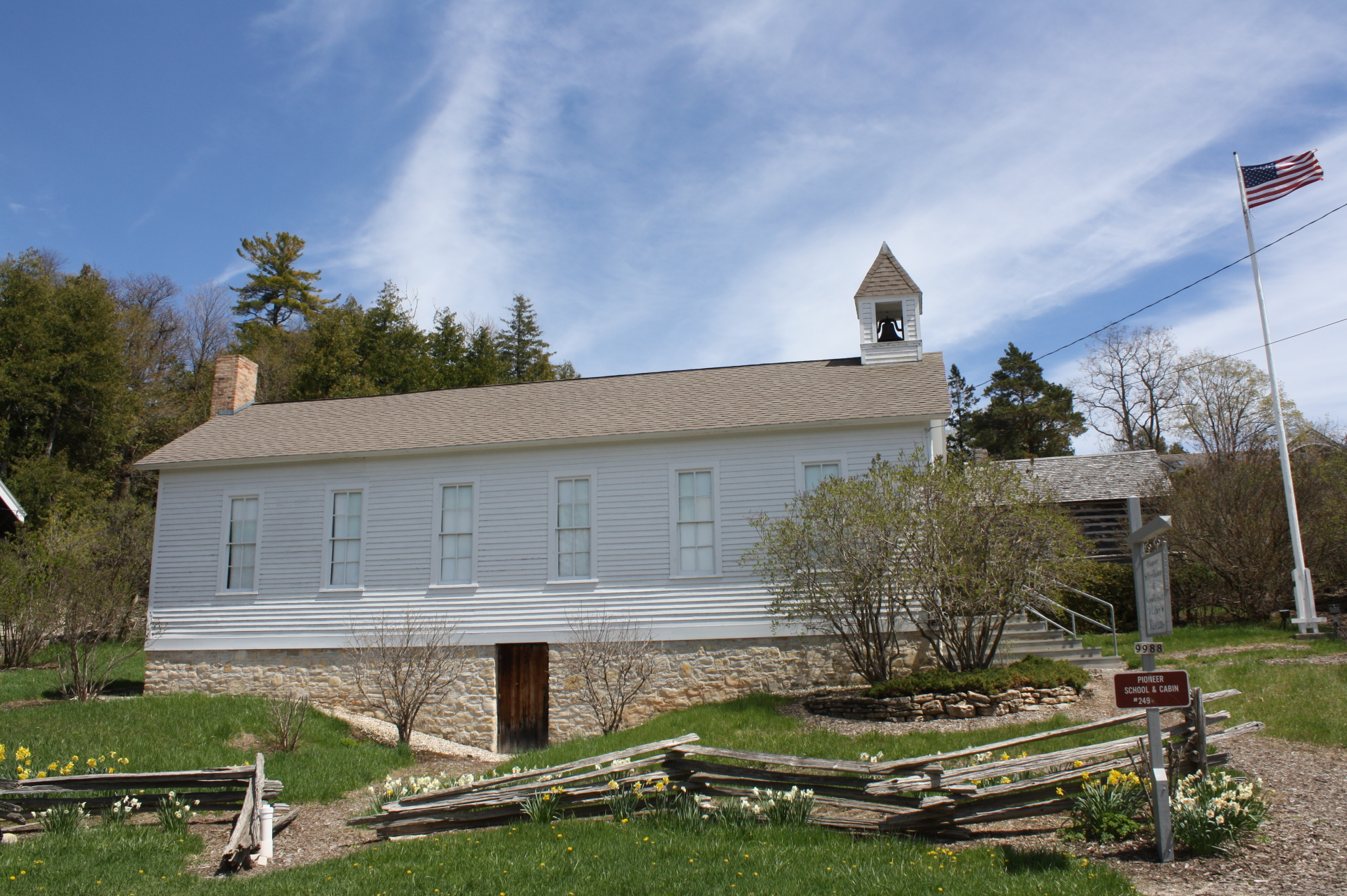
- Side of the school

- Location within Wisconsin Location within the United States
- Location: 9988 Moravia St., Ephraim, Wisconsin
- Coordinates: 45°9′22″N 87°10′7″W
- Area: Less than 1 acre (0.40 ha)
- Built: 1869
- MPS: Ephraim MRA
- NRHP reference No.: 85001250
- Added to NRHP: June 11, 1985

The Gibraltar District School No. 2 is a historic one-room school on the Door Peninsula in the town of Gibraltar, Door County, Wisconsin, United States. Built in the 1860s to serve children in the village of Ephraim, it operated as a school for approximately eighty years before closing and being converted into a museum. It has been designated a historic site because of its place in the area's history.

The school is now operated as the Pioneer Schoolhouse Museum by the Ephraim Historical Foundation.

== Community history ==
Ephraim was founded by a group of Moravians who had emigrated from Norway; it was founded to be a permanent settlement, unlike the many resource extraction camps that dotted the Door Peninsula. The Norwegians settled in Wisconsin under the leadership of Andreas Iverson, who had previously lived in Milwaukee. Iverson and several other men bought, surveyed, and platted land at the community's present site in early 1853, and small temporary houses were scattered over the townsite by the next year. Children were among some of the earliest residents, and the importance of education in the Moravian Church meant that a school was soon needed: the first educational institution was organized in 1854. Three years later, the town of Gibraltar was officially established, with Ephraim included in its borders, and Andreas Iverson donated land for a school at Ephraim and was elected to the school board. In 1857, the Norwegian settlers used this property to erect Gibraltar's first school, a log building.

== Architecture ==
By the late 1860s, a new school was needed, and Ephraim built the present building in 1869. It was one of many schools built in Door County in the late 1860s, as the county was then in the process of consolidating its school districts. At that time, the school's enrollment was nearly 150 students, who met for classes for slightly less than half of each year; education in the area was hampered by sparse settlement in the heavily wooded countryside. Additionally, the local newspaper claimed that poor-quality teachers and school buildings diminished the quality of education that local children could receive in local schools.

The Gibraltar District School #2 is a substantial one-room frame school with many improvements that were intended to resolve problems with other schools that county officials had noted. Besides being larger than previous schools, it included large windows to light the interior effectively. Local schoolchildren attended it until the construction of a newer one-room school in 1948. As it was no longer needed for scholastic purposes after the new school was built, the old school was restored by a local history organization before being converted into a museum and offices for a local arts group.

== Historic site ==
In 1985, the Gibraltar District School #2 was listed on the National Register of Historic Places, qualifying because of its place in the area's history. It was one of several buildings in Gibraltar to be added to the Register together as part of a multiple property submission.
