= August Draize Farmstead =

- U.S. National Register of Historic Places
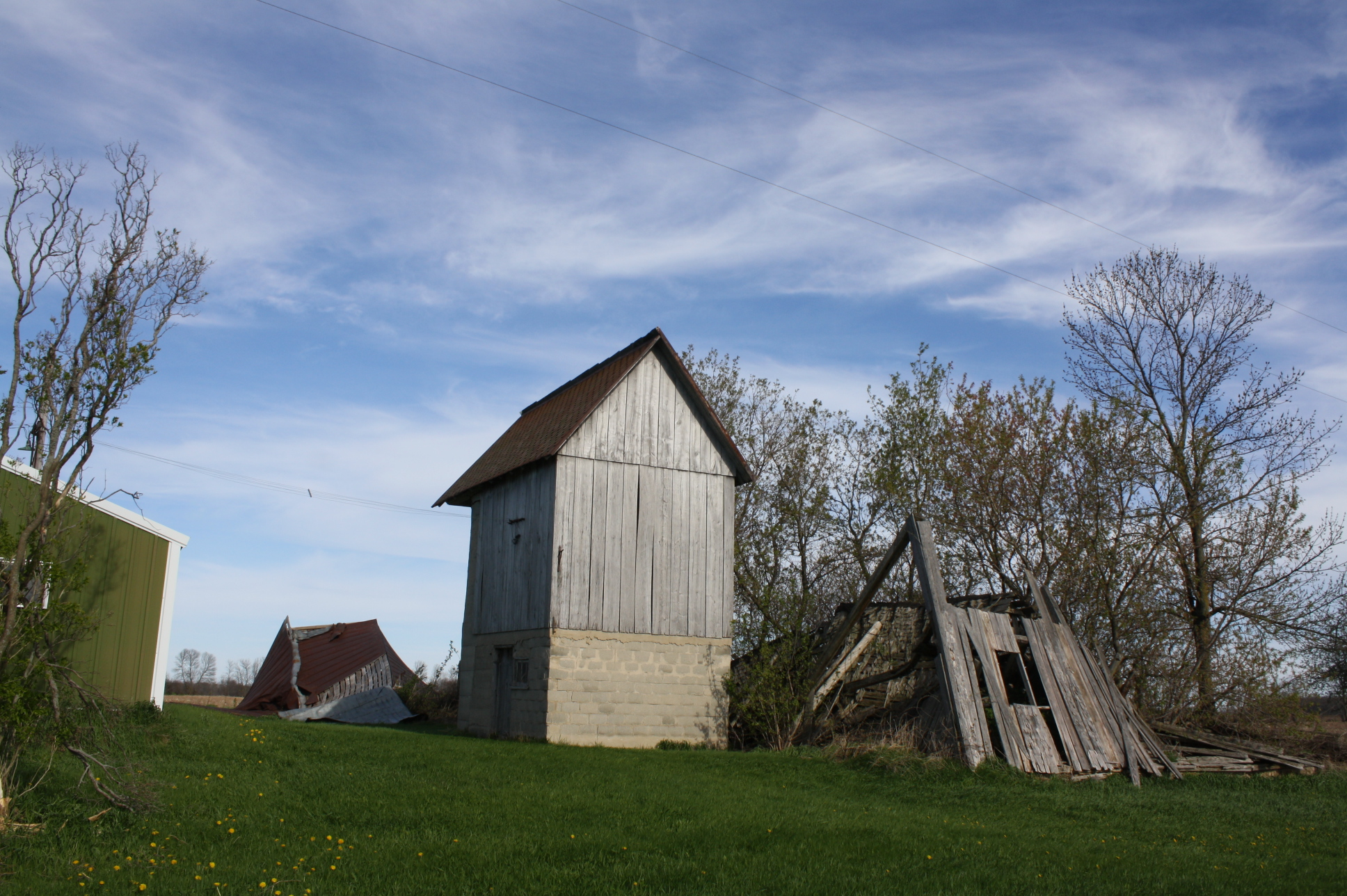
- A shed and barn at the farmstead.
- Location: 814 Tru-Way Rd., Union, Door County, Wisconsin
- Coordinates: 44°42′37″N 87°39′01″W
- Area: 2.2 acres (0.89 ha)
- Built: 1880
- Architectural style: Late 19th and Early 20th Century American Movements
- NRHP reference No.: 04000398
- Added to NRHP: May 6, 2004

The August Draize Farmstead is located in Union, Door County, Wisconsin. The farmstead is notable in part due to its association with the history of Belgian settlement in Wisconsin. It was added to the State and the National Register of Historic Places in 2004.
