= Fleetwing (shipwreck) =

Schooner that sank in Lake Michigan

- U.S. National Register of Historic Places
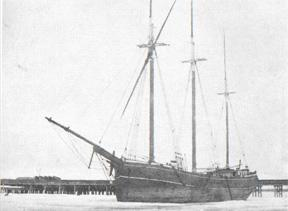

- Location within Wisconsin
- Location: Lake Michigan off Liberty Grove, Wisconsin
- Coordinates: 45°17′15″N 87°2′59″W
- NRHP reference No.: 01000734
- Added to NRHP: July 11, 2001

Fleetwing was a schooner that sank in Lake Michigan off Liberty Grove, Wisconsin, United States. In 2001 the shipwreck site was added to the National Register of Historic Places.

== History ==
Fleetwing was constructed in Manitowoc, Wisconsin, in 1867 by what is now known as the Burger Boat Company. Her finished cost was $30,000. She was rebuilt in 1885.

On September 26, 1888, Fleetwing departed Menominee, Michigan, bound for Chicago, Illinois, with a cargo of lumber. Later that night, as the ship approached Porte des Morts, a gale began to form. Reports of what happened later conflict, but what is known is that at 11:00 p.m., the ship struck a rocky beach that apparently sheared off a mast. Initially, efforts were made to save the vessel, but another gale began to form during the process and the tugboat that had been attempting to retrieve Fleetwing was forced to leave the area. By the time the tugboat was able to return, the second gale had caused irreparable damage to Fleetwing.

The State of Wisconsin owns the wreck of Fleetwing and the Wisconsin Historical Society and Wisconsin Department of Natural Resources manage the wreck site. The wreck lies in 10 to 30 feet (3.0 to 9.1 m) of water in Garrett Bay.
