= Joachine J. Falque House =

Historic house in Wisconsin, United States

- U.S. National Register of Historic Places
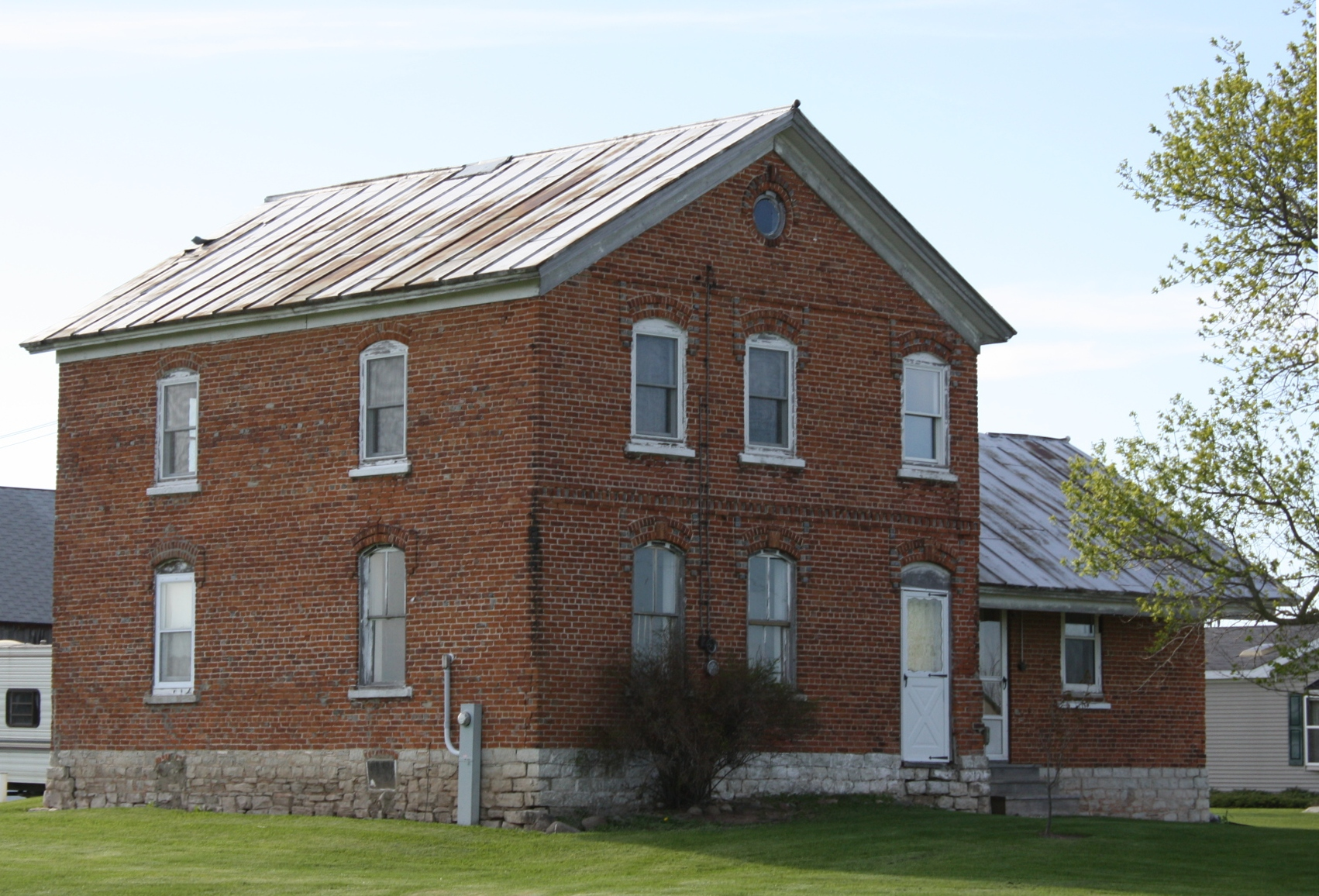
- Joachine J. Falque House

- Location within Wisconsin Location within the United States
- Location: 1059 County Trunk Highway C, Brussels, Wisconsin
- Coordinates: 44°43′19″N 87°37′17″W
- Area: 1.9 acres (0.77 ha)
- Built: 1880
- Architectural style: Late 19th and Early 20th Century American Movements
- NRHP reference No.: 04000407
- Added to NRHP: May 6, 2004

The Joachine J. Falque House is located in Brussels, Wisconsin. It was added to the State and the National Register of Historic Places in 2004.
