= Louisiana Street/Seventh Avenue Historic District =

Historic district in Wisconsin, United States

- U.S. National Register of Historic Places
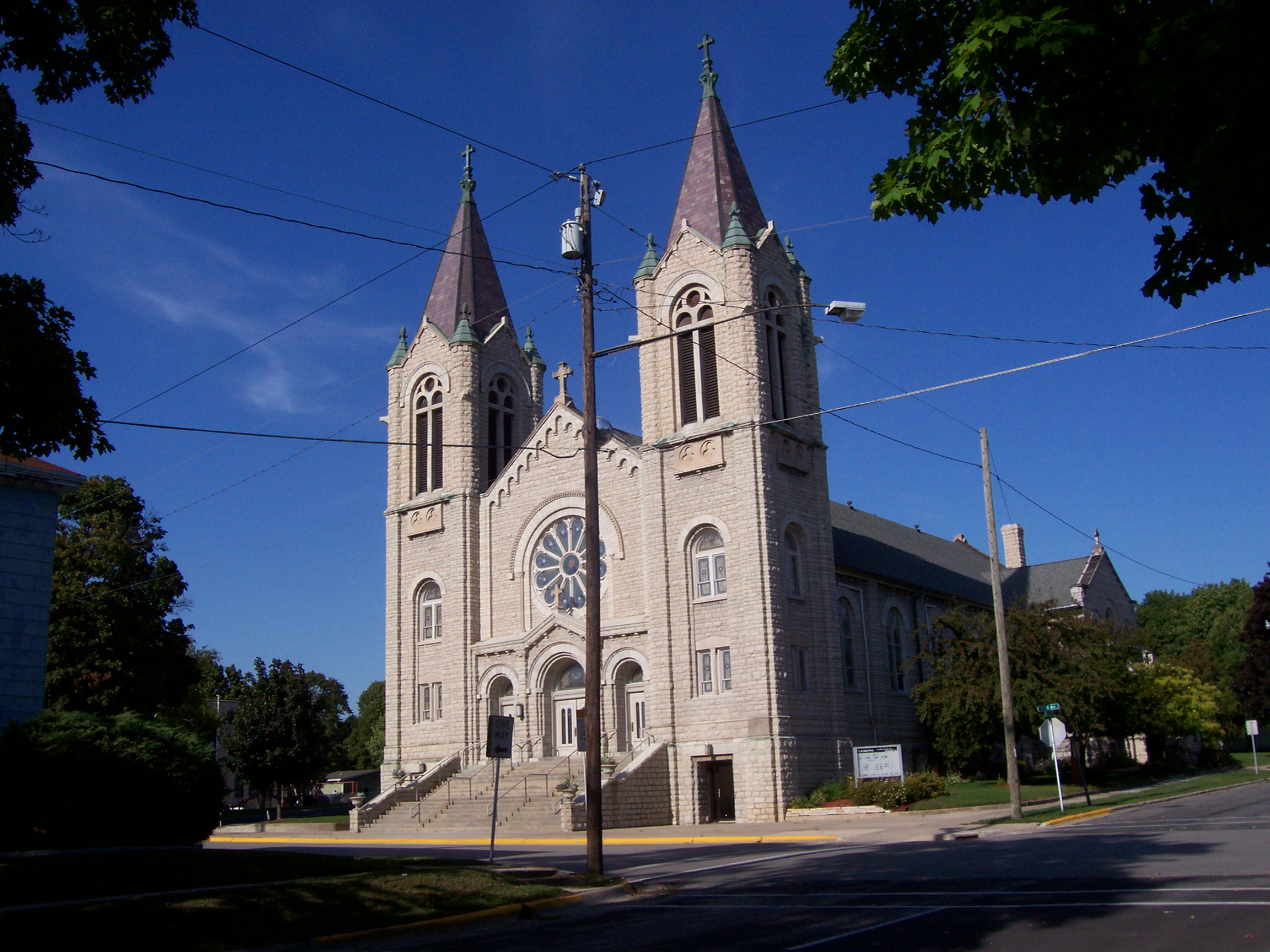
- St. Joseph's Catholic Church, located in the district.
- Location: Roughly bounded by Louisiana and Kentucky Sts., N. 5th, N. 7th, and N. 8th Aves., Sturgeon Bay, Wisconsin
- Coordinates: 44.83717°N 87.37254°W
- Area: 20.9 acres (8.5 ha)
- NRHP reference No.: 83003372
- Added to NRHP: September 22, 1983

The Louisiana Street/Seventh Avenue Historic District is located in Sturgeon Bay, Wisconsin. It was listed on the National Register of Historic Places in 1983 and on the State Register of Historic Places in 1989.
