= Teweles and Brandeis Grain Elevator =

- U.S. National Register of Historic Places
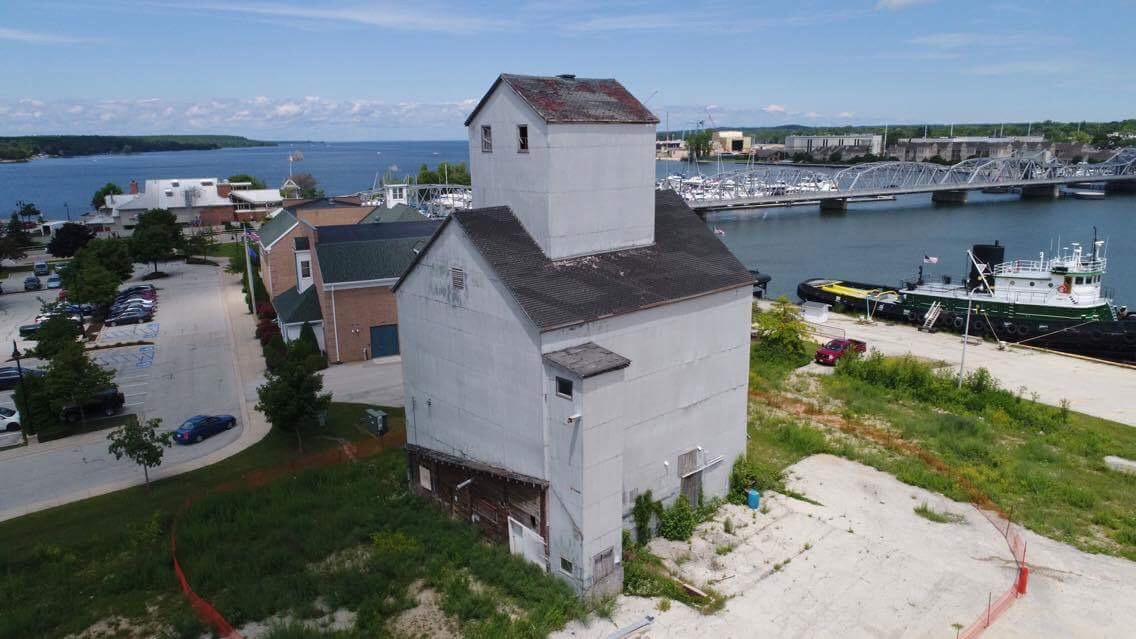
- Teweles and Brandeis Grain Elevator

- Location within Wisconsin Location within the United States
- Location: 92 E. Maple St. Sturgeon Bay, Wisconsin
- NRHP reference No.: 100002091
- Added to NRHP: February 5, 2018

The Teweles and Brandeis Grain Elevator is located in Sturgeon Bay, Wisconsin, United States. It was added to the State Register of Historic Places in 2017 and to the National Register of Historic Places in 2018.

This grain elevator was built in 1901 as the centerpiece of a no longer extant complex of buildings that was owned by the firm of Teweles & Brandeis. It is located on the west shore of Sturgeon Bay, which separates the east side of the City of Sturgeon Bay from its west side.

A newspaper article from the time says, “An elevator is to be erected on the refrigerator wharf during the ensuing season by A. W. Lawrence. The plans are now being prepared by a competent architect, and the structure will undoubtedly be complete by the time the new crop is ready for market. It is to be located as far east as the present buildings on the wharf will permit, and to make room a part of the latter is to be removed. A spur will be run in from the main track of the railway and every facility afforded for the rapid and economical handling of the product of the farm. The necessary lumber is now being sawed out by Mr. Lawrence’s mill located in Menominee county, and the material brought here by vessel after the opening of navigation. Mr. Lawrence also intends to open a lumber yard on the vacant ground adjacent to the refrigerator."

"The new elevator is to cost something like $7,000. Work has been commenced in clearing away the site, and the driving of piles will soon begin."

An announcement concerning the elevator appeared early in March 1901. “Teweles & Brandies are planning to erect a large grain elevator in the fourth ward during the coming summer. A. W. Lawrence will furnish the lumber and says that that is the full extent to which he will engage in the lumber business in the city this year”.

The builders of the new elevator were E. L. Russell (1840-1923) and W. R. Lindsey, carpenter contractors based in Sturgeon Bay.

Teweles & Brandeis continued to operate and upgrade their west side elevator until the firm was finally dissolved in 1953, after which it was owned by the Door County Co-Op, which operated it until the mid-1960s. The structure is currently being restored as a project of the Sturgeon Bay Historical Society Foundation. The restoration is being led by LA DALLMAN, a Boston-based architecture firm run by Harvard Graduate School of Design faculty member Grace La and her husband James Dallman.
