= Third Avenue Historic District (Sturgeon Bay, Wisconsin) =

Historic district in Wisconsin, United States

- U.S. National Register of Historic Places
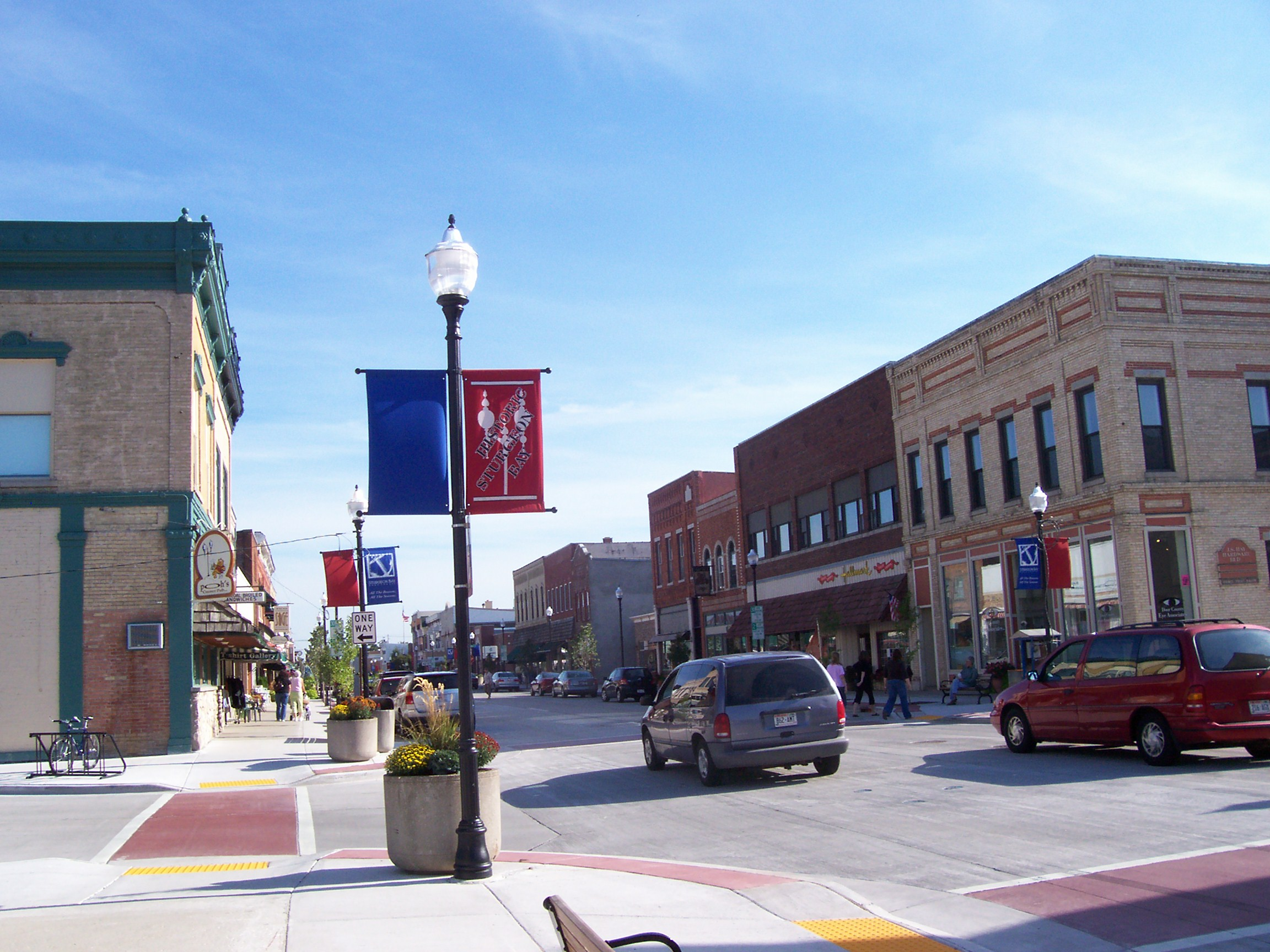
- A portion of the district.

- Location within Wisconsin Location within the United States
- Location: Roughly bounded by Kentucky St., N. 2nd, N. 3rd, and S. 3rd Aves., Sturgeon Bay, Wisconsin
- Area: 11.7 acres (4.7 ha)
- NRHP reference No.: 83004282
- Added to NRHP: October 6, 1983

The Third Avenue Historic District in Sturgeon Bay, Wisconsin is a historic district which was listed on the National Register of Historic Places in 1983.

It is a mixed business and residential district including the 1872 John Masse Hardware-Tin Shop, the Queen Anne Wegener Business Block built in the 1880s and 1890s, the 1906 Neoclassical Merchant's Exchange Bank, and the 1935 Art Moderne George Draeb Jewelry Store. It was listed on the National Register of Historic Places in 1983 and on the State Register of Historic Places in 1989.

The district is roughly bounded by Kentucky St., N. 2nd, N. 3rd, and S. 3rd Avenues, and included 38 contributing buildings. It includes examples of Classical Revival and Queen Anne architecture.

Most of the district's buildings "are faced with cream or vermilion colored brick or light grey limestone, stand two or two and one-half stories high, and are crowned with ornate cornices of pressed metal or corbelled brickwork. By 1910, this basic type of building replaced an earlier generation of frame stores, as well as houses comparable to those still standing within the District on Second Avenue." A notable exception is the wood-clad John Masse Hardware and Tin Shop (built 1872, remodelled 1893), at 22 S. Third Avenue.
