= Joseph Monfils Farmstead =

- U.S. National Register of Historic Places
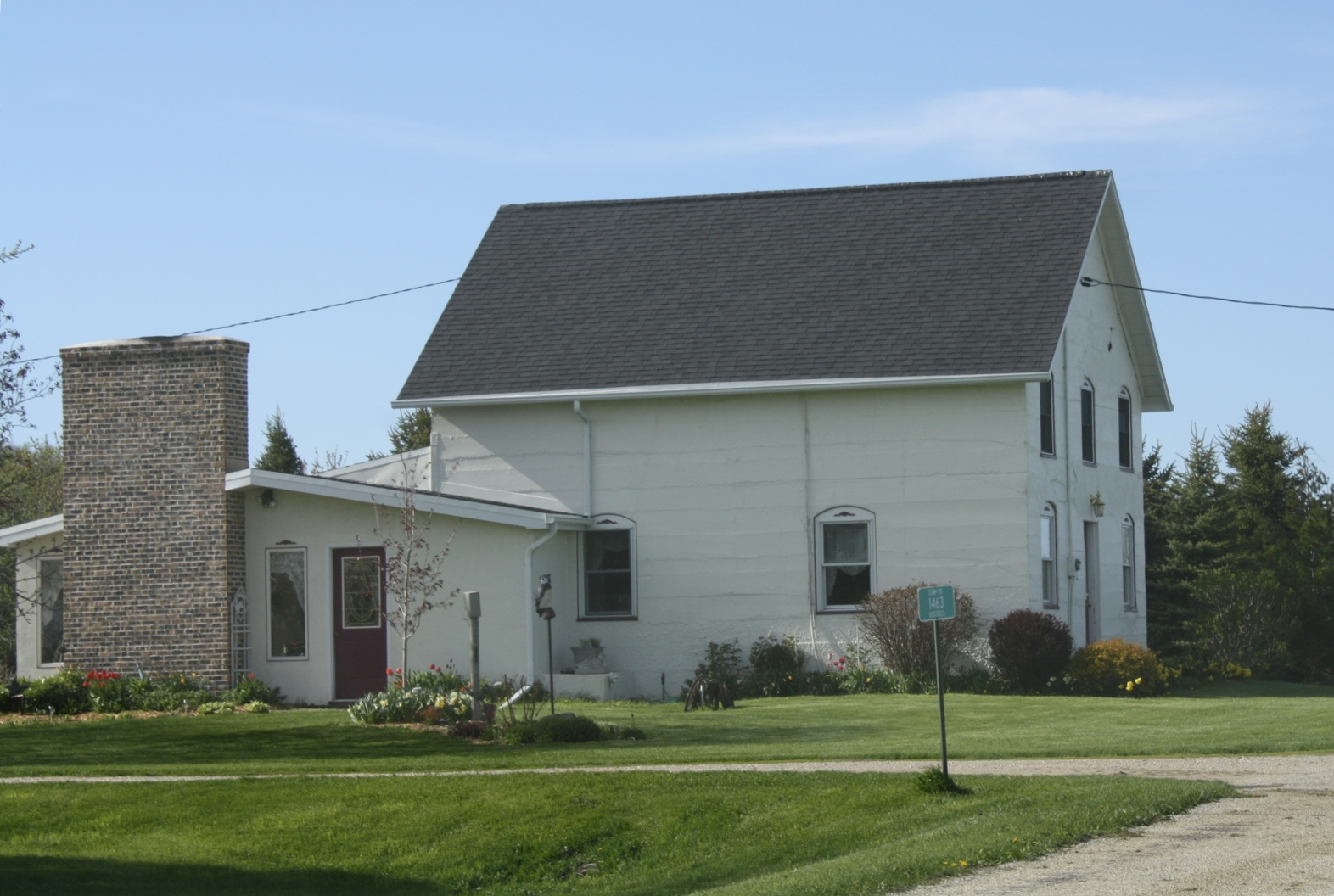
- Joseph Monfils Farmstead
- Location: 1463 Dump Rd., Brussels, Wisconsin
- Coordinates: 44°44′29″N 87°34′50″W
- Area: 1.8 acres (0.73 ha)
- Built: 1921
- Architect: Joseph Cumber
- Architectural style: Late 19th and Early 20th Century American Movements
- NRHP reference No.: 04000409
- Added to NRHP: May 6, 2004

The Joseph Monfils Farmstead is located in Brussels, Wisconsin.

== History ==
The property belonged to John and Theresa Monfils, who operated a wheat farm. It was added to the State and the National Register of Historic Places in 2004.
