= Porte des Morts =

Strait linking Lake Michigan and Green Bay

Coordinates: 45°17′36″N 86°57′31″W

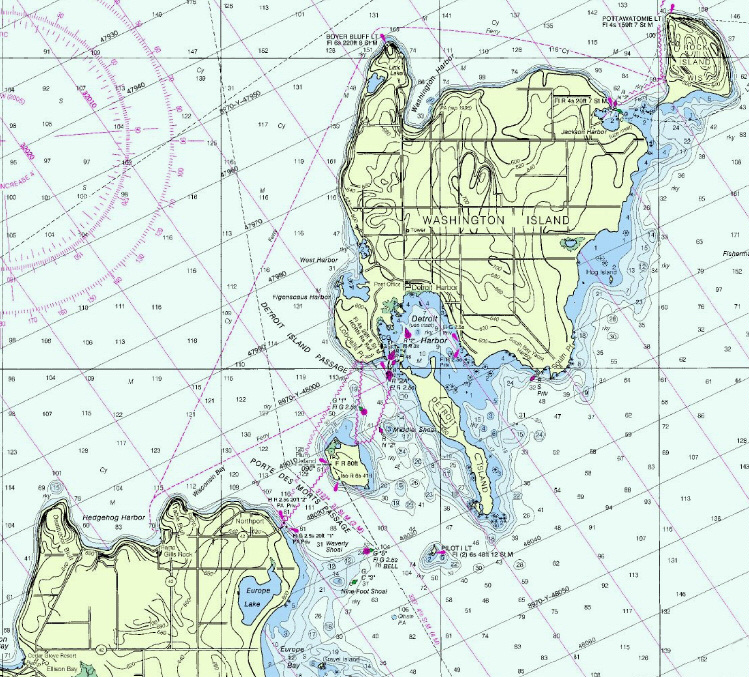
Detail of NOAA Chart #14909

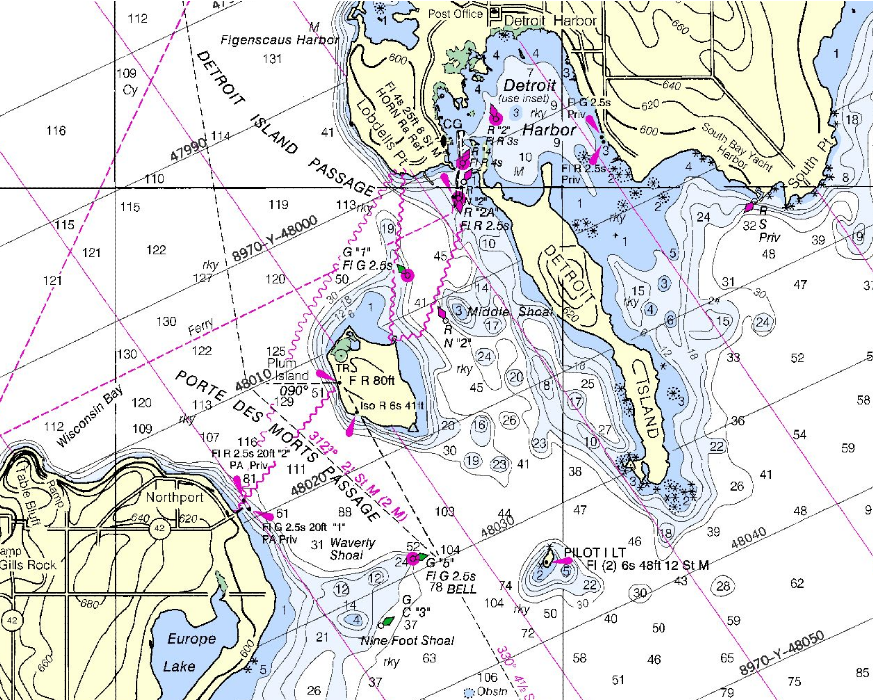
Closer detail of NOAA Chart

Porte des Morts, also known as Porte des Mortes, the Door of Death, and Death's Door, is a strait linking Lake Michigan and Green Bay between the northern tip of the Door Peninsula and the southernmost of the Potawatomi Islands. At its narrowest reach between Plum Island and the peninsula, the Porte des Morts Passage is about one and one third miles across. The name is French and means "door of the dead".

== Hydrology ==
North of the peninsula, warm water from Green Bay flows into Lake Michigan on the surface, while at the same time, cold lakewater enters Green Bay deep underneath.

== Name origin ==
According to traditions given by the Native Americans to area fishermen in the 1840s and reported both by Captain Brink, a government engineer who surveyed the area in 1834, and by Hjalmar R. Holand in his two-volume history of Door County, the ominous name is traced back to a battle between the Winnebago and Potawatomi tribes. Holand's report is as follows:

The Winnebago, having migrated from the southwest, were not content to share the land with the gentle Potawatomi, who had arrived before them. They had already pushed the latter from the peninsula to the islands and were preparing to attack the islands, too. The Potawatomi devised a desperate plan for defense. They sent three scouts to spy out the Winnebago positions. The spies were then to light a signal fire so the Potawatomi warriors could land safely and attack the Winnebago from behind. The spies, however, were discovered and captured. Two died with their secret, but one revealed the plan.

Knowing the plan, the Winnebago decided to use it to their advantage and devised a two pronged attack. They chose a high bluff where there was no safe landing and set a signal fire there. There they planned to intercept the war party as they were helpless in their canoes. They sent a second group to attack the villages of the Potawatomi, which would be defenseless with their warriors gone.

When the Potawatomi defenders left the islands, the weather was relatively calm, but by the time they were mid channel, a stiff north wind set in. They pressed on, however, confident that they could land safely near the signal fire. When they arrived, the Winnebago attacked, raining destruction from above. They could not land, and the strong north wind and waves prevented their fleeing to safety. Canoes capsized in the surf and were dashed against the rocks. A few Potawatomi managed to climb to a ledge a short distance above the waves. Some of the Winnebago jumped down to the ledge and fighting continued there until a large wave took them all to their deaths in the lake.

After the battle at the bluff, the remaining Winnebago waited for the return of their second party. The wind and waves that had prevented the Potawatomi from fleeing apparently also caught the Winnebago raiding party. They were never seen again. The Winnebago took it as a sign that they should not try to cross to the islands again, for it was, they concluded, a doorway to death.

The report seems to be biased in favor of the Potawatomi. The Winnebago, or to use their own chosen name the Ho-Chunk, do not describe themselves as fierce. Various historical accounts indicate that it was the Potawatomi who were the newcomers to the area and that the Winnebago had recently suffered greatly at the hands of the Illinois. If this account accurately gives the origin of the name, the battle probably occurred in the mid seventeenth century, shortly after the Potawatomi settled in the area and before the French used the area enough to name the strait.

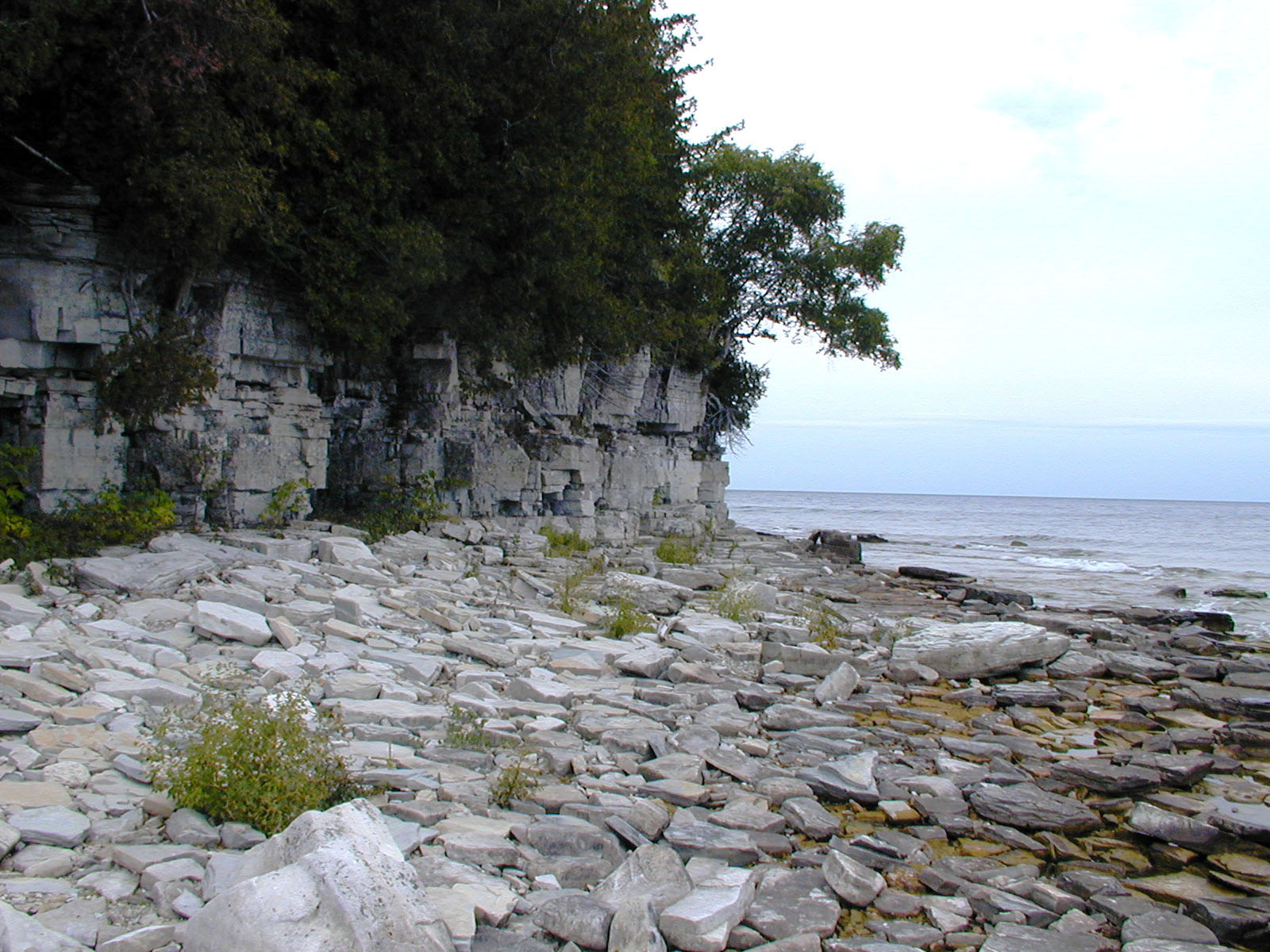
If the Porte des Morts battle happened it could have occurred here at Door Bluff (also called Deathdoor Bluff). This is typical of a number of places on the northern coast of the Door Peninsula. The escarpment seen here is between 15 and 20 feet high. Above that is a gentle slope up for about 50 feet and another similar escarpment above that. The broad flat rocks at the base of the cliff are high enough to be out of most of the surf in stormy seas, yet low enough to be awash in a rogue wave. At the time this photo was taken, the lake was about 1.8 feet below its long term average level. The wind was from the south at about 15 mph, gusting to about 25 mph. In the "Detail of NOAA Chart #14909" (above), Deathdoor Bluff is the point at the far left of the chart.

Other explanations for the origin of the name have been offered. One account involving Native Americans has a tribe building a ring of campfires on thin ice to lure their enemies through the strait overnight. The plan worked and the attackers perished. Another mentions a storm in which canoes were dashed against the rock but mentions no battle. It has also been said that the French, not wanting the English to establish fur trade routes to Wisconsin and other surrounding areas, named the passage to discourage and scare sailors from sailing through the strait. Yet the strait had its name well before the English were coming to the Great Lakes.

It is possible that the "doorway to death" name has a much larger significance. The written history of the area between Jean Nicolet's visit to Green Bay in 1634 and the return of French trappers in the late 1650s is virtually a blank page. Thus, the only reasons that can be found for the drastic reduction in the population of the Winnebago in that time period—from estimates of between ten and twenty thousand to five, six, or seven hundred—are those that can be gleaned from the natives' own oral traditions, which by the time they make it to a recorder's pen often mix and confuse details of separate events. R. David Edmunds relates that after the Winnebago successfully repulsed the first advance of the Potawatomi, they lost several hundred warriors in a storm on Lake Michigan. Carol Mason also refers to the loss of 600 warriors, but does not indicate on which body of water they were lost and questions the credibility of the report. Lee Sultzman says Lake Winnebago was the location and that 500 warriors were lost in a failed attack against the Fox. James Clifton says more than 500 were lost in a battle with the Sauk, who entered northeast Wisconsin about the same time as the Potawatomi. Others say that the Winnebago were allied with both the Fox and Sauk. Edmunds opines that such a loss could not by itself result in the near decimation of the whole people, and offers that two other causes should also be included. The Winnebago during this time apparently also suffered greatly from a disease, perhaps one of the European plagues like smallpox (although the Winnebago say it resulted in the victims turning yellow, which is not a trait of smallpox). Finally, it appears that a sizeable contingent of their historic enemies, the Illinois, came on a mission of mercy to help the Winnebago at time of suffering and famine—what one might expect after the loss of 600 men who were also their hunters. Perhaps remembering former hostilities, however, the Winnebago repaid the kindness by adding their benefactors to their diet. The Illinois were enraged and in the ensuing retaliation they almost totally wiped out the Winnebago.

It is not likely that there was more than one separate incident in which upwards of 500 or 600 warriors were lost in a storm. The fact that only warriors are mentioned suggests that they were lost in some kind of military effort. It does seem clear that the initial influx of Potawatomi (about 1641 to 1643) was repulsed, and that later the Potawatomi returned in strength. By the time the French returned to the area the Potawatomi were well established in northeast Wisconsin, not only in the Potawatomi Islands of Door County, but also at what is now the city of Green Bay. Lake Michigan is much more capable of producing deadly waves than is Lake Winnebago. While it must remain speculation, it is nonetheless reasonable to conclude that the Porte des Morts battle really happened, that it was the end of the Winnebago's pushing out the first wave of Potawatomi, that the loss of 600 warriors in a storm corresponds with the loss of warriors in the Porte des Morts tradition, and that the event marked not just the doorway to death for those who died at the bluff and in the storm, but the beginning of events that brought death to nearly the whole tribe. One may never be certain as to the origin of the name, but it seems to suggest a significant event, and the records of the French tie no event of their history to the name.

Different early accounts of what happened are recorded in a 1967 book by Conan Bryant Eaton.

== Reputation ==
"A small ledge just above the water at Door Bluff County Park, measuring about 6 feet by 18 feet."

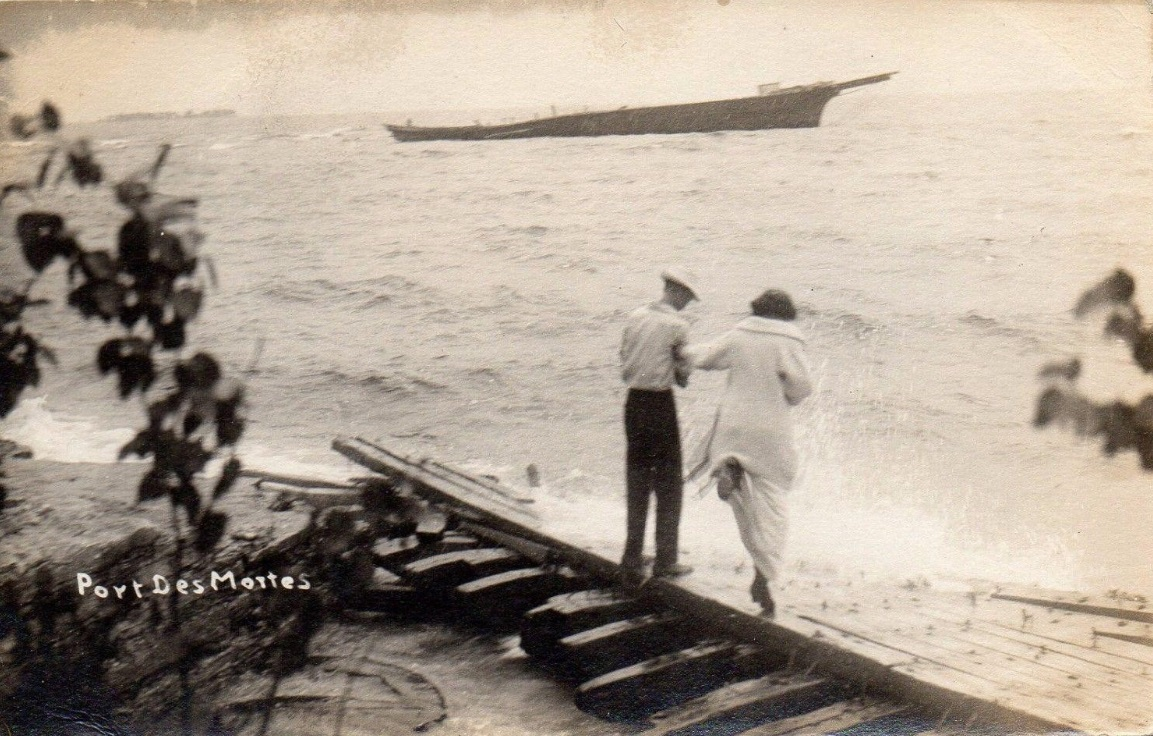
A couple observing a wreck in the Porte des Morts; from a postcard prior to 1915

A number of factors combine to make this a particularly dangerous strait. Older sailing vessels were not as maneuverable as modern motor boats. The strait is relatively narrow. Shoals extend far from shore. Winds on the Great Lakes are notoriously unpredictable and can increase to gale forces and more almost without warning. The strait is also a combination of three separate passageways. Plum Island and tiny Pilot Island are almost in the center of what is commonly considered Death's Door, and pose hazards. While the Porte des Morts Passage proper to the south of Plum Island is relatively hazard free, the Detroit Island Passage to the north of Plum Island has many. The water between Detroit Island and Washington Island hides shoals that are not navigable, except by small boats like canoes.

Ships lost in Death's Door include the Fleetwing in 1888, the A.P. Nichols, Forest, and J.E. Gilmore in 1892. The wrecks of Death's Door have taken relatively few human lives.

So great is the reputation of Porte des Morts that a number of shipwrecks have been attributed to it that did not happen in the strait. One of these is the loss of the Griffin (also spelled Griffon), the first sailing ship on the upper Great Lakes. The Griffon was last seen sailing from Washington Island, but it was sailing north, not south into Death's Door. One account does say that she sailed from Detroit Harbor, which does open on Death's Door, but the same account says those on shore watched it sail north, which is impossible from that location. Another possible point of departure for the Griffin would be Washington Harbor on the north side of Washington Island or even Rock Island, which lies just northeast of Washington Island. There have been many who have claimed to have found the remains of the Griffin, but not one has been verified. The most recent "discovery" is awaiting funding and legal process before it can collect sufficient evidence to support or refute the claim. Another ship erroneously said to have grounded in Death's Door is the Louisiana, which records clearly show beached and burned on the shore of Washington Harbor

Death's Door was used primarily by vessels sailing between ports along Green Bay and those along middle to southern Lake Michigan. Going around Washington Island would add roughly thirty miles to the voyage. At a time when ships made between five and ten miles an hour in good sailing weather, that meant three to six additional hours. So captains used Death's Door often until the Sturgeon Bay Ship Canal was completed in 1878. By using the canal sailors could not only avoid Death's Door, but especially could shorten their voyage by over a hundred miles.

== Modern usage ==
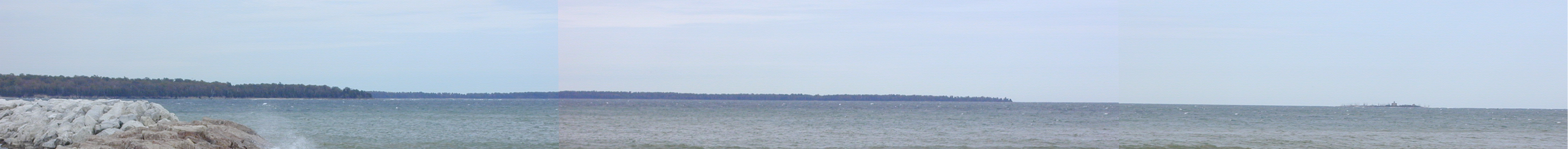
Porte des Morts Passage from beach at Northport, showing ferry harbor breakwater and Plum Island at left, Detroit Island center, and Pilot Island at right. An abandoned lighthouse is the only structure on Pilot Island.

While Great Lakes freighters still navigate through Death's Door Passage on occasion on routes from Lake Superior to ports in Green Bay waters, most use the Rock Island Passage. Freighters from southern Lake Michigan will use the Sturgeon Bay ship canal constructed in 1881. Commercial ferries transit Death's Door Passage daily to provide transport from mainland Door County to Washington Island. Recreation boating is common since navigation is not dangerous with modern marine electronics.

As sheets of ice in the Porte des Mortes passage fragment apart, they are able to form long ice stringers extending into Lake Michigan and also crossing the Rock Island passage. In 2014, a photo of this phenomenon was featured as the NASA Earth Observatory Image of the Day.

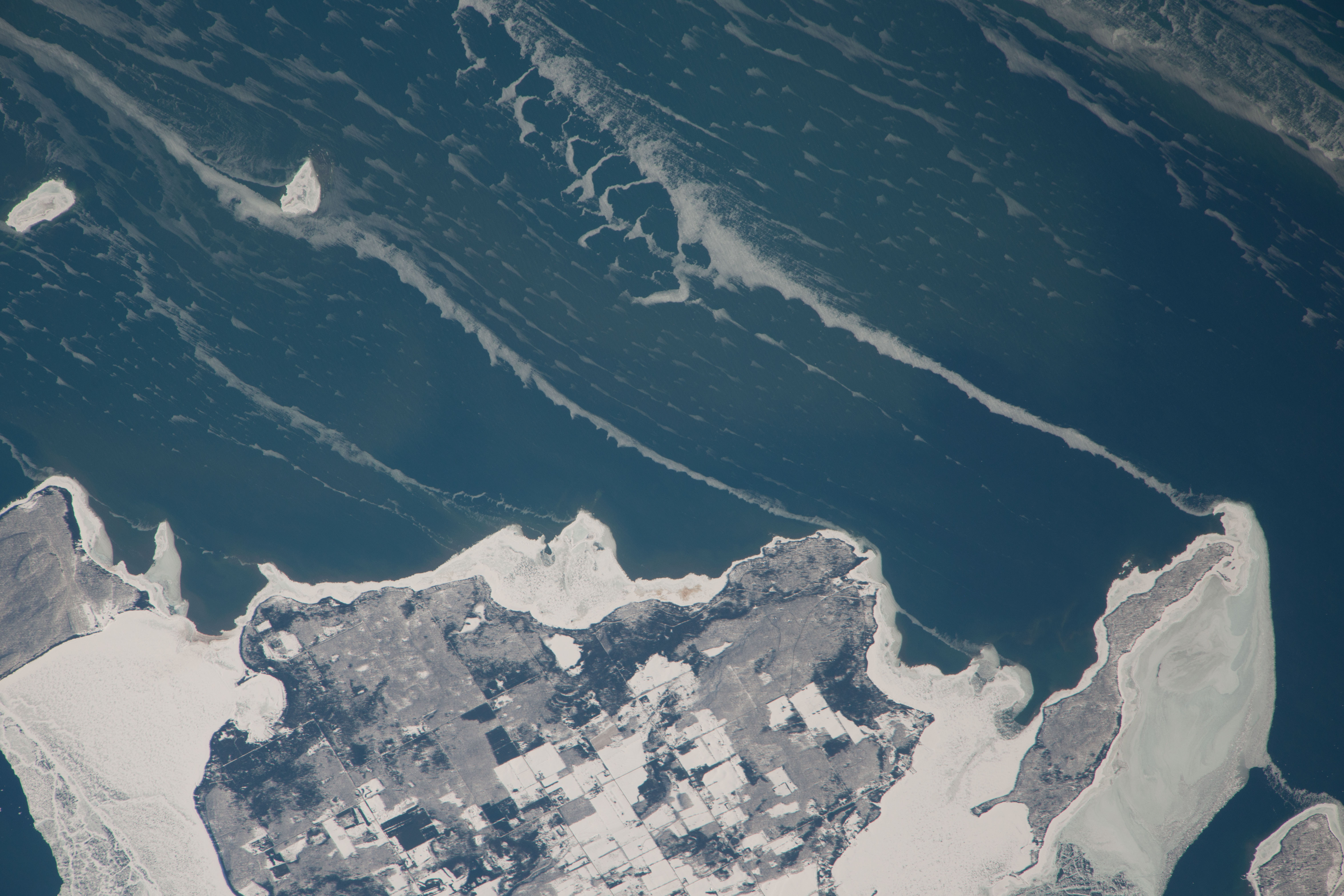
Ice stringers, February 22, 2014. On that day, southwesterly winds were blowing ice into the lake in the form of long, coherent stringers. The thickness of a stringer is related to the length of coastline that feeds it. The smallest northern stringer (image left) is fed by the shortest section of upwind coastline, and the longest (image right) is supplied by the large amount of shore ice around Detroit Island.

== Climate ==
Porte des Morts

Climate chart (precipitation, max. and min. temperature)
J	F	M	A	M	J	J	A	S	O	N	D
66 −4 −9	60 −8 −10	62 0 −4	112 3 0	86 9 3	77 13 10	96 18 16	73 19 16	109 17 14	119 10 7	110 6 5	66 4 1
- █ Average max. and min. temperatures in °C
- █ Precipitation totals in mm
Imperial conversion
J	F	M	A	M	J	J	A	S	O	N	D
2.6 25 16	2.4 18 14	2.4 32 25	4.4 37 32	3.4 48 37	3 55 50	3.8 64 61	2.9 66 61	4.3 63 57	4.7 50 45	4.3 43 41	2.6 39 34
- █ Average max. and min. temperatures in °F
- █ Precipitation totals in inches

=== Waves ===
In 1978 it was reported that waves in the Porte des Morts passage can exceed those in Green Bay or Lake Michigan by up to 0.6 meters (two feet).

Water conditions begin to deteriorate in August and are worst in October and November, when lakewide wave heights of 5 to 10 feet are encountered about 35 percent of the time. In October, southerly through southwesterly winds are most often responsible for the waves, while by November westerly through northerly winds often generate rough water conditions. Waves of 10 feet or more are encountered 3 to 5 percent of the time from November through March. Extreme waves of 20 to 22 feet have been encountered. During the spring, high waves are infrequent, but 5- to 10-foot waves develop 15 to 30 percent of the time in the south and 20 to 40 percent in the north. In the summer, waves climb above 10 feet less than 1 percent of the time, while those in the 5- to 10-foot range drop to less than 20 percent in June and July.

=== Winds ===
Coastal winds are more localized and variable. Along the Lake Michigan shore, spring winds are variable, particularly in the morning, when northerlies, easterlies, and southerlies are among the most common. By afternoon, aided by a lake-breeze effect, there are a preponderance of winds out of the south, particularly with the approach of summer. Summer also brings a slackening of windspeeds. The likelihood of encountering winds of 28 knots or more falls from a 4- to 10-percent chance in March to less than 3 percent by May. However, Green Bay recorded a 95-knot southwesterly one May; it is not unrealistic to expect a wind extreme of 100 knots or more over open waters. Spring winds can still blow strong, with winds of 28 knots or more encountered about 4 to 8 percent of the time. They do slacken from their winter fierceness, with southerlies and southwesterlies becoming more frequent and northerlies less so as summer approaches. Strong winds are infrequent in summer and mostly associated with thunderstorms. Southerly and southwesterly winds prevail particularly in the north. Southeasterlies are also common in the south, with northerlies also present.

In late fall and in the spring, winds blow cleaner lake water into Green Bay. Lake seiches also drive lake water into the bay, but winds are thought to play a larger role.

== See also ==
- National Register of Historic Places listings in Door County, Wisconsin § Porte des Morts Site
