= J.B. Bouche House =

Historic house in Wisconsin, United States

- U.S. National Register of Historic Places
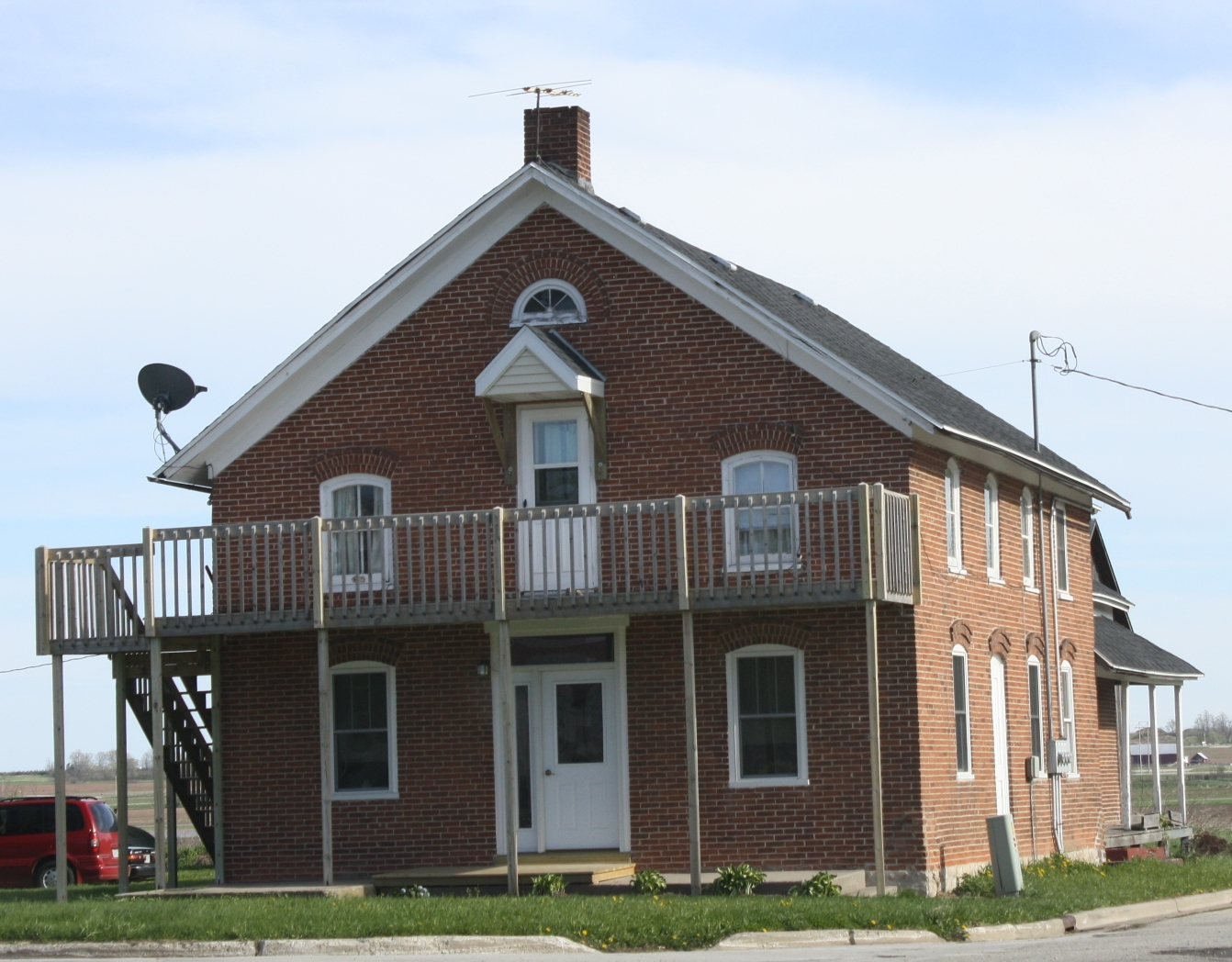
- J. B. Bouche House

- Location within Wisconsin Location within the United States
- Location: 9697 School Rd., Brussels, Wisconsin
- Coordinates: 44°44′02″N 87°37′15″W
- Area: less than one acre
- Architectural style: Late 19th and Early 20th Century American Movements
- NRHP reference No.: 04000411
- Added to NRHP: May 6, 2004

The J. B. Bouche House is located in Brussels, Wisconsin. It was added to the State and the National Register of Historic Places in 2004.
