= Gibraltar, Wisconsin =

- Town
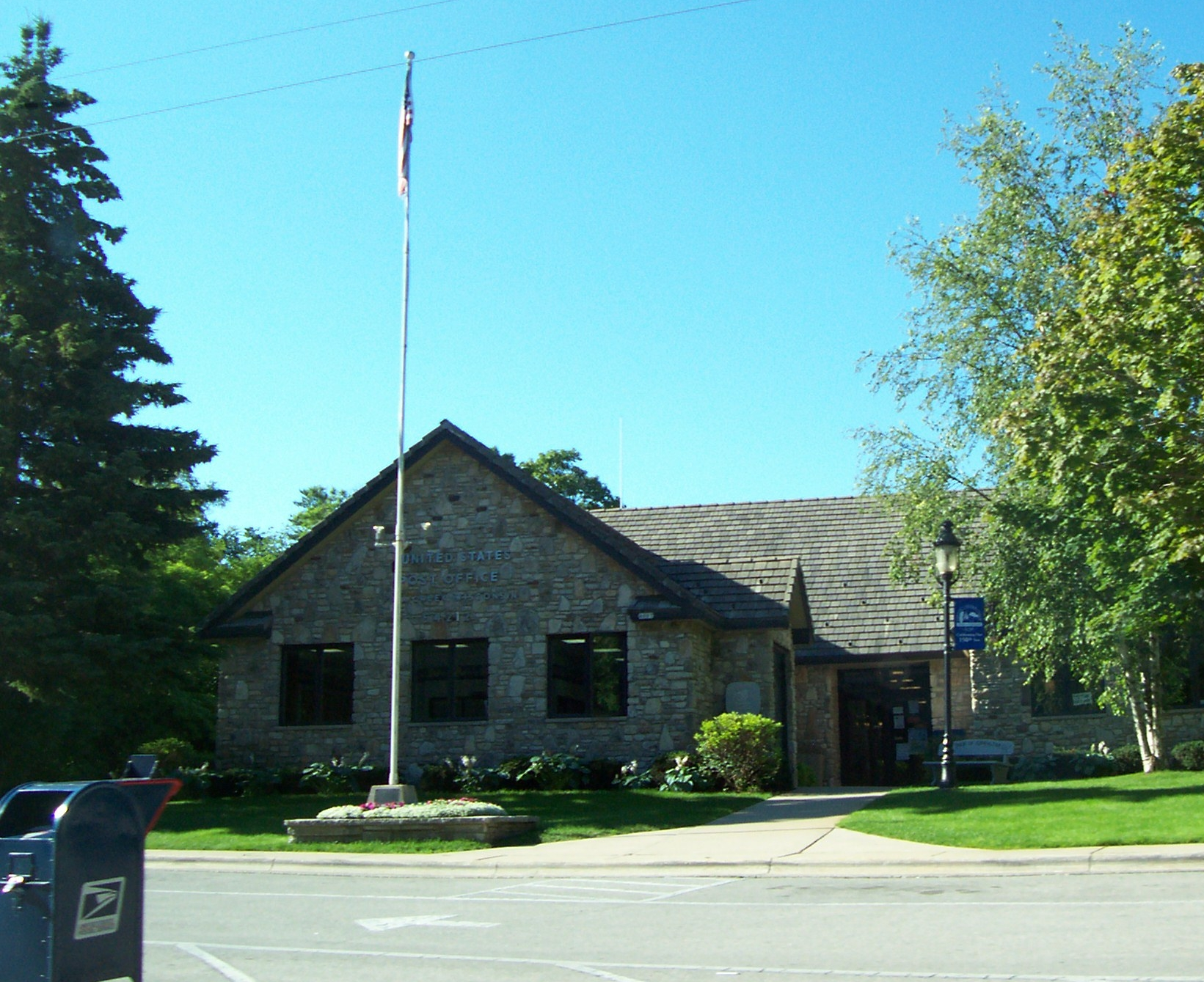
- The town center building

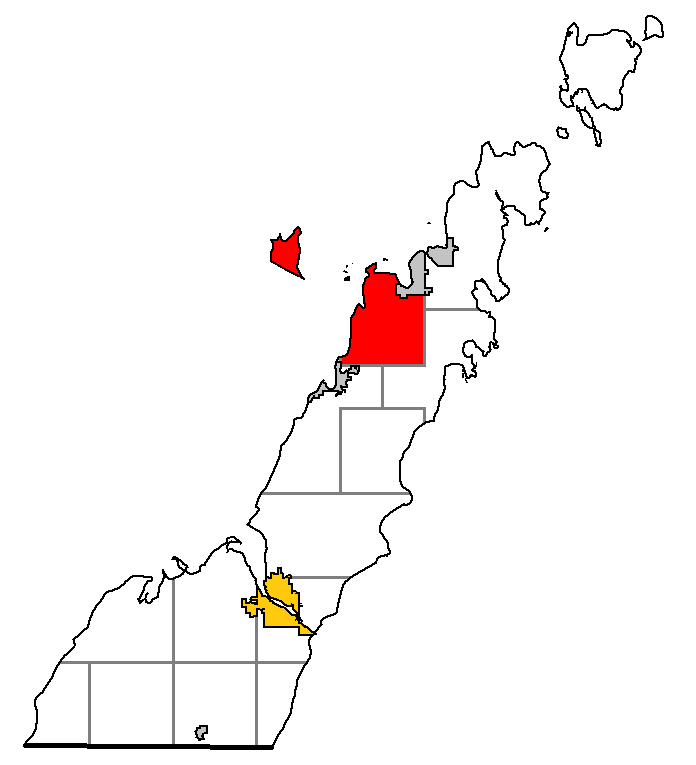
- Location of Gibraltar, within Door County
- Coordinates: 45°7′53″N 87°14′58″W
- Country: United States
- State: Wisconsin
- County: Door

Area
  - Total: 151.4 sq mi (392.2 km^{2})
  - Land: 33.9 sq mi (87.7 km^{2})
  - Water: 117.6 sq mi (304.6 km^{2})
- Elevation: 594 ft (181 m)

Population (2020)
  - Total: 1,228
  - Density: 30/sq mi (11.7/km^{2})
- Time zone: UTC-6 (Central (CST))
  - Summer (DST): UTC-5 (CDT)
- Area code: 920
- FIPS code: 55-28950
- GNIS feature ID: 1583271
- Website: https://gibraltarwi.gov/

Gibraltar is a town in Door County, Wisconsin, United States. The population was 1,228 at the 2020 census. The unincorporated communities of Fish Creek and Juddville are located in the town.

== Geography ==
According to the United States Census Bureau, the town has a total area of 151.4 square miles (392.2 km^{2}), of which 33.8 square miles (87.7 km^{2}) is land and 117.6 square miles (304.6 km^{2}) (77.65%) is water.

== Demographics ==
Historical population
Census	Pop.	Note	%±
2000	1,063		—
2010	1,021		−4.0%
2020	1,228		20.3%
U.S. Decennial Census

As of the census of 2000, there were 1,063 people, 475 households, and 328 families residing in the town. The population density was 31.4 people per square mile (12.1/km^{2}). There were 1,159 housing units at an average density of 34.2 per square mile (13.2/km^{2}). The racial makeup of the town was 97.93% White, 0.19% African American, 0.19% Native American, 0.19% Asian, 0.94% from other races, and 0.56% from two or more races. Hispanic or Latino of any race were 1.60% of the population.

There were 475 households, out of which 19.8% had children under the age of 18 living with them, 62.3% were married couples living together, 4.6% had a female householder with no husband present, and 30.9% were non-families. 25.3% of all households were made up of individuals, and 8.2% had someone living alone who was 65 years of age or older. The average household size was 2.24 and the average family size was 2.65.

In the town, the population was spread out, with 16.1% under the age of 18, 4.9% from 18 to 24, 21.6% from 25 to 44, 38.1% from 45 to 64, and 19.3% who were 65 years of age or older. The median age was 48 years. For every 100 females, there were 102.9 males. For every 100 females age 18 and over, there were 104.1 males.

The median income for a household in the town was $47,604, and the median income for a family was $58,125. Males had a median income of $31,607 versus $26,625 for females. The per capita income for the town was $29,755. About 1.8% of families and 4.2% of the population were below the poverty line, including 2.8% of those under age 18 and 1.0% of those age 65 or over.

== Education ==
Gibraltar Elementary School and Gibraltar Secondary School are the two schools in Gibraltar Area Schools.

== Climate ==
Sand Point (within the town)

Climate chart (precipitation, max. and min. temperature)
J	F	M	A	M	J	J	A	S	O	N	D
63 −8 −11	52 −15 −16	49 −3 −7	97 2 −1	86 7 3	91 14 11	105 18 17	96 17 16	96 17 15	107 10 9	80 8 6	57 4 3
- █ Average max. and min. temperatures in °C
- █ Precipitation totals in mm
Imperial conversion
J	F	M	A	M	J	J	A	S	O	N	D
2.5 18 12	2 5 3	1.9 27 19	3.8 36 30	3.4 45 37	3.6 57 52	4.1 64 63	3.8 63 61	3.8 63 59	4.2 50 48	3.1 46 43	2.2 39 37
- █ Average max. and min. temperatures in °F
- █ Precipitation totals in inches

== Gallery ==
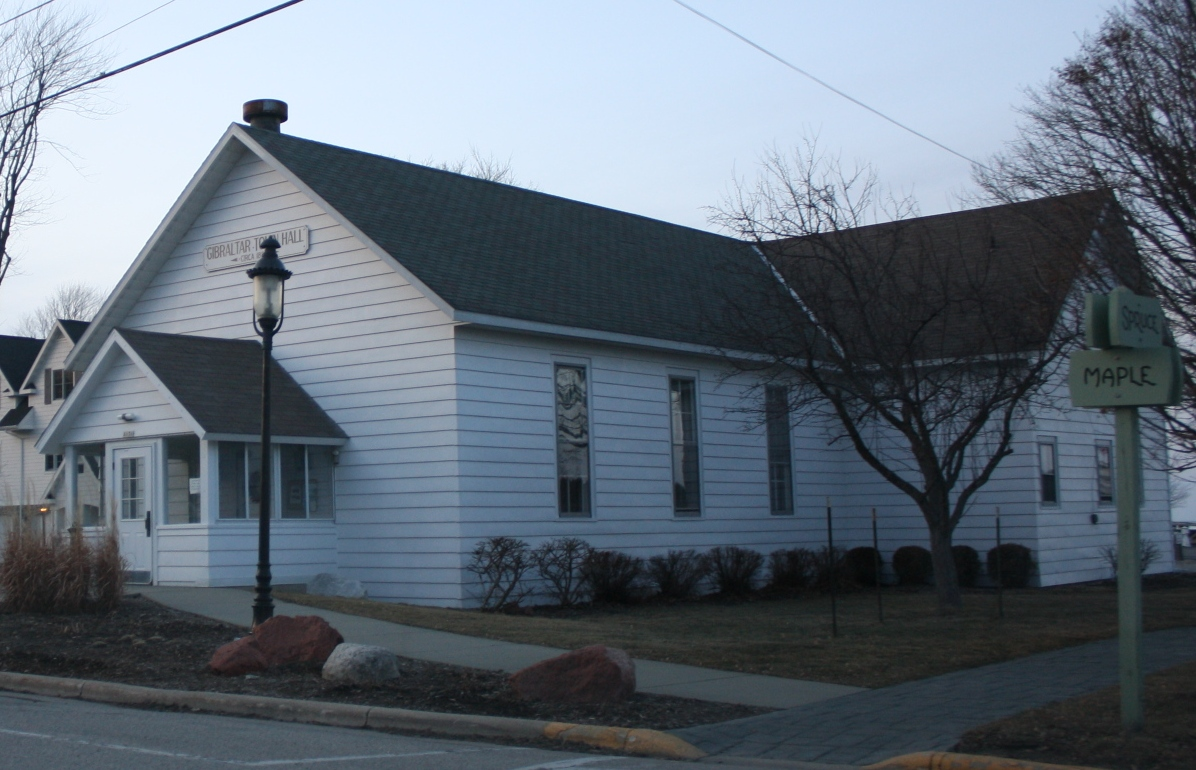
19th century historic town hall

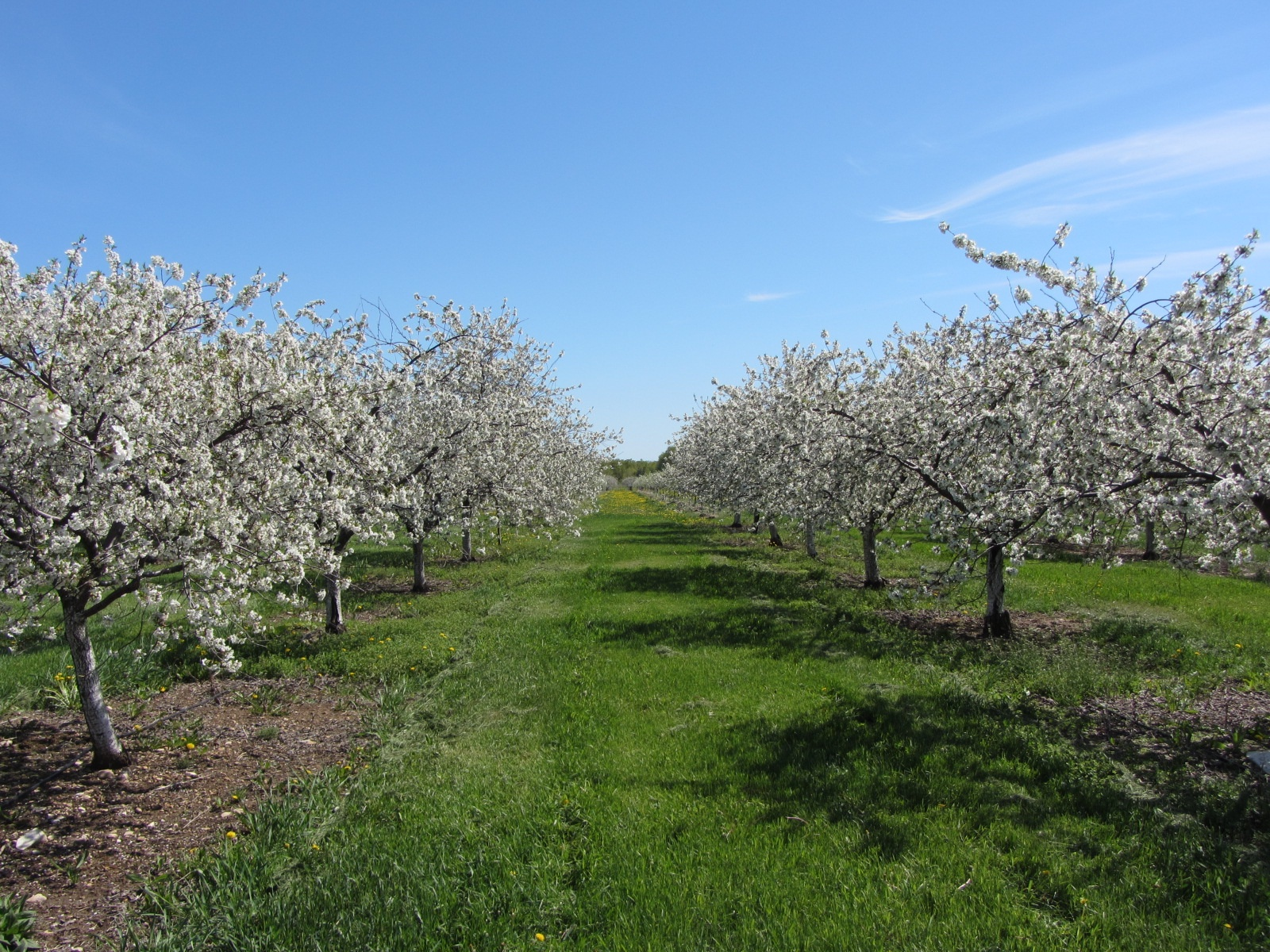
Cherry orchard in Gibraltar, May

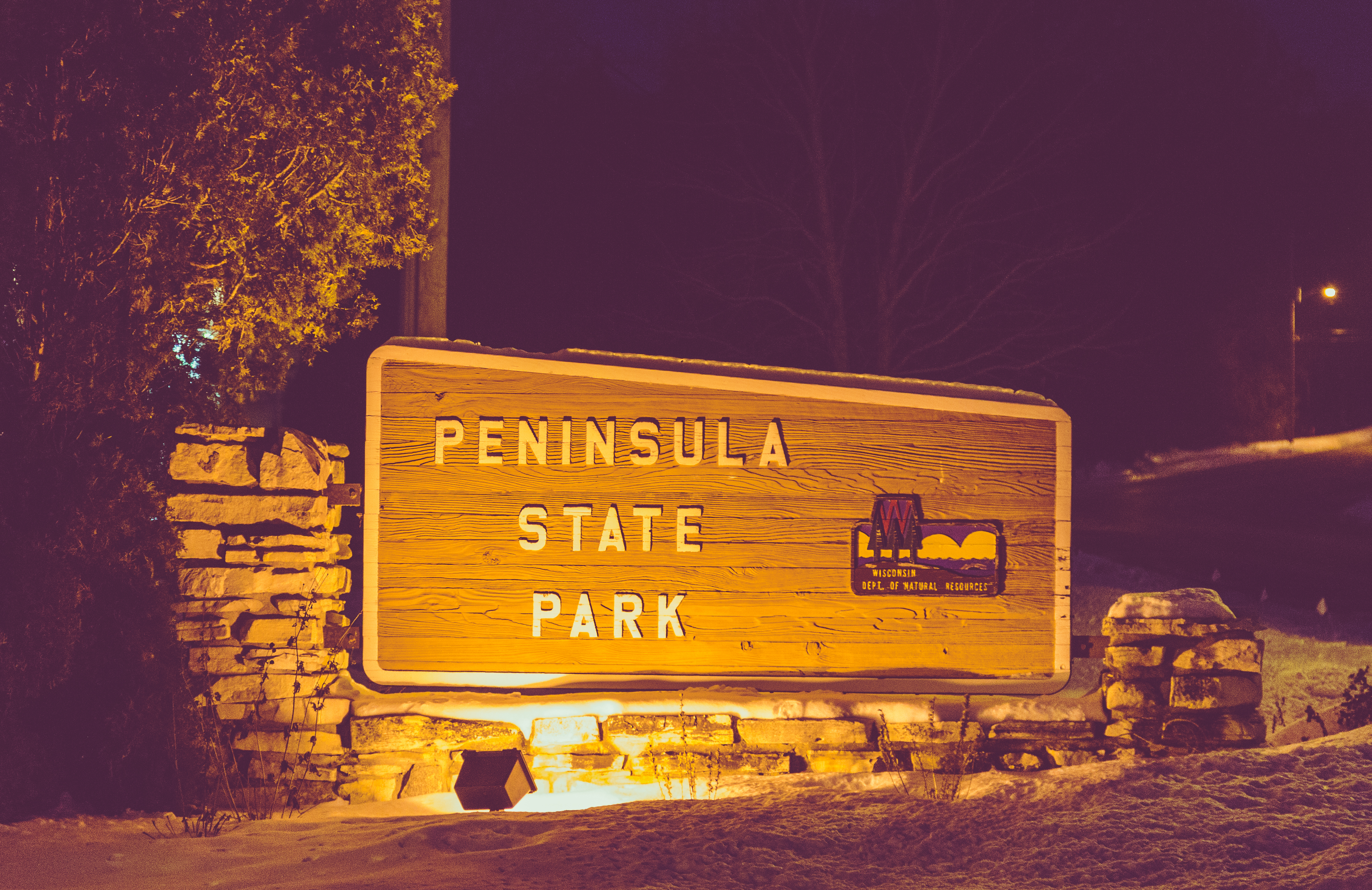
Peninsula State Park is mostly located in the town.

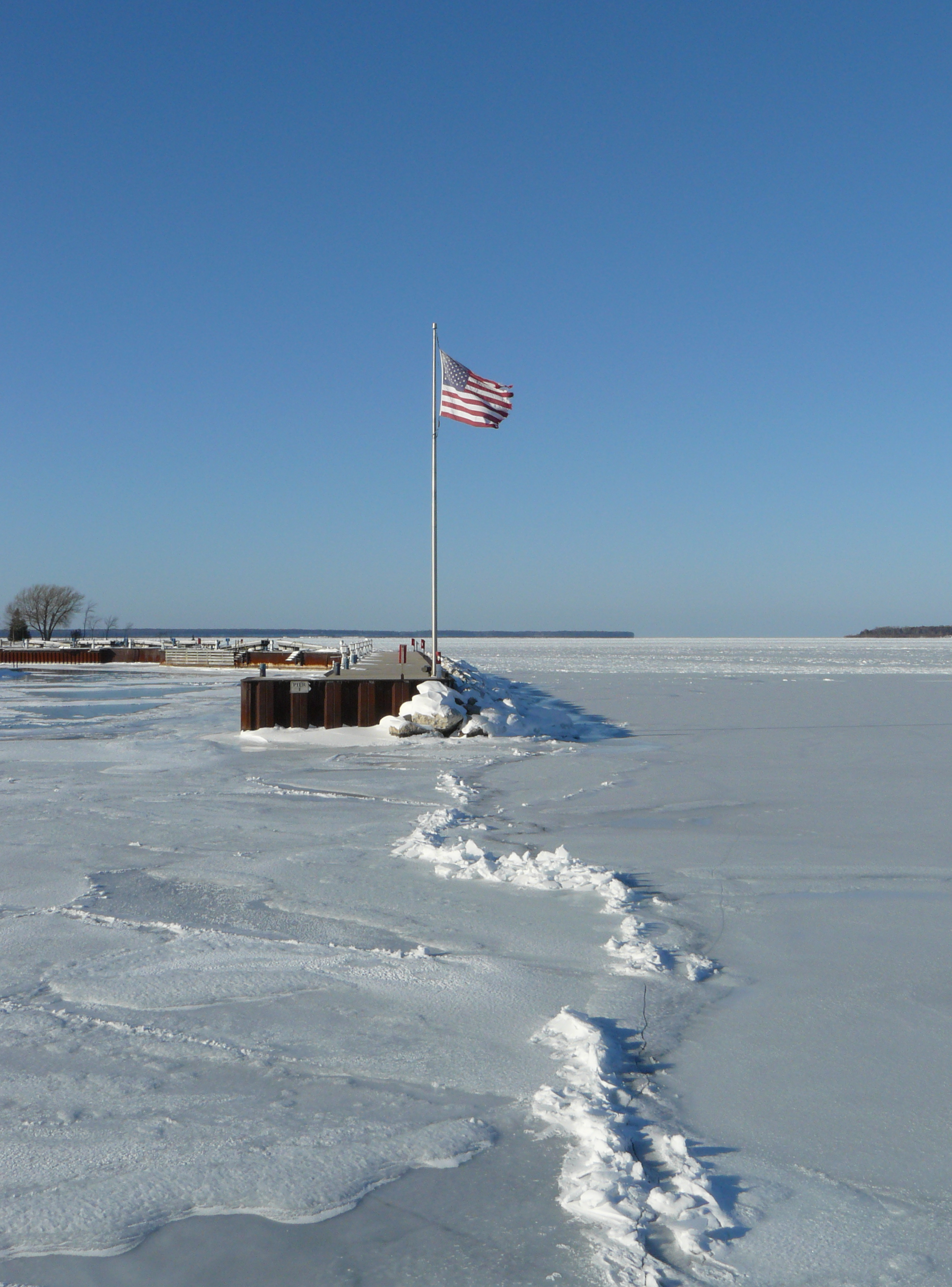
Fish Creek Town Dock is operated by the town; most of the dock is removed from the water for the winter

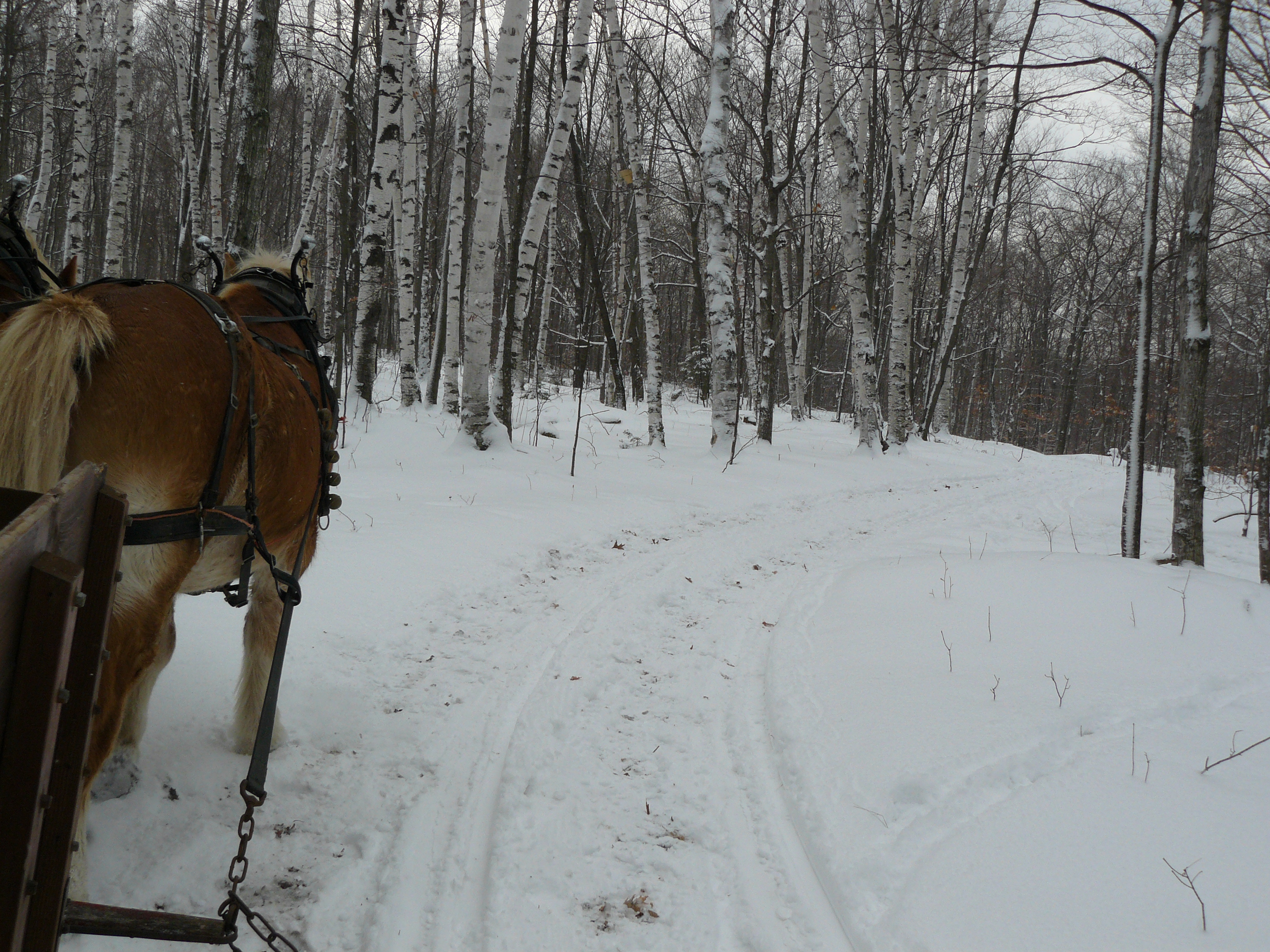
White birch in Gibraltar
