= Selkirk Light =

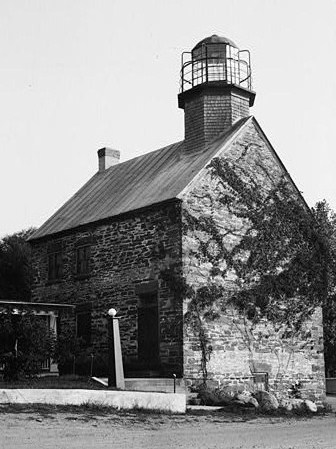
- Location: In New York, at the mouth of the Salmon River, on Lake Ontario, Pulaski, New York
- Coordinates: 43°34′24″N 76°12′06″W

Tower
- Constructed: 1838
- Foundation: Natural/Emplaced
- Construction: Wood Tower on Fieldstone House
- Automated: 1989
- Shape: Octagon
- Markings: Red Tower w/ Silver Lantern on three-story gray house
- Heritage: National Register of Historic Places listed place

Light
- First lit: 1838
- Deactivated: 1858–1989
- Focal height: 50 feet (15 m)
- Lens: 8 lamps, 14-inch (360 mm) reflectors (original), 7.5-inch (190 mm) (current)
- Characteristic: Flashing White 2 seconds
- Selkirk Lighthouse
- U.S. National Register of Historic Places
- NRHP reference No.: 79001618
- Added to NRHP: March 30, 1979

Selkirk Lighthouse is located at mouth of the Salmon River in New York. It is one of only four lighthouses in the United States that retains its original bird-cage lantern.

== Construction ==
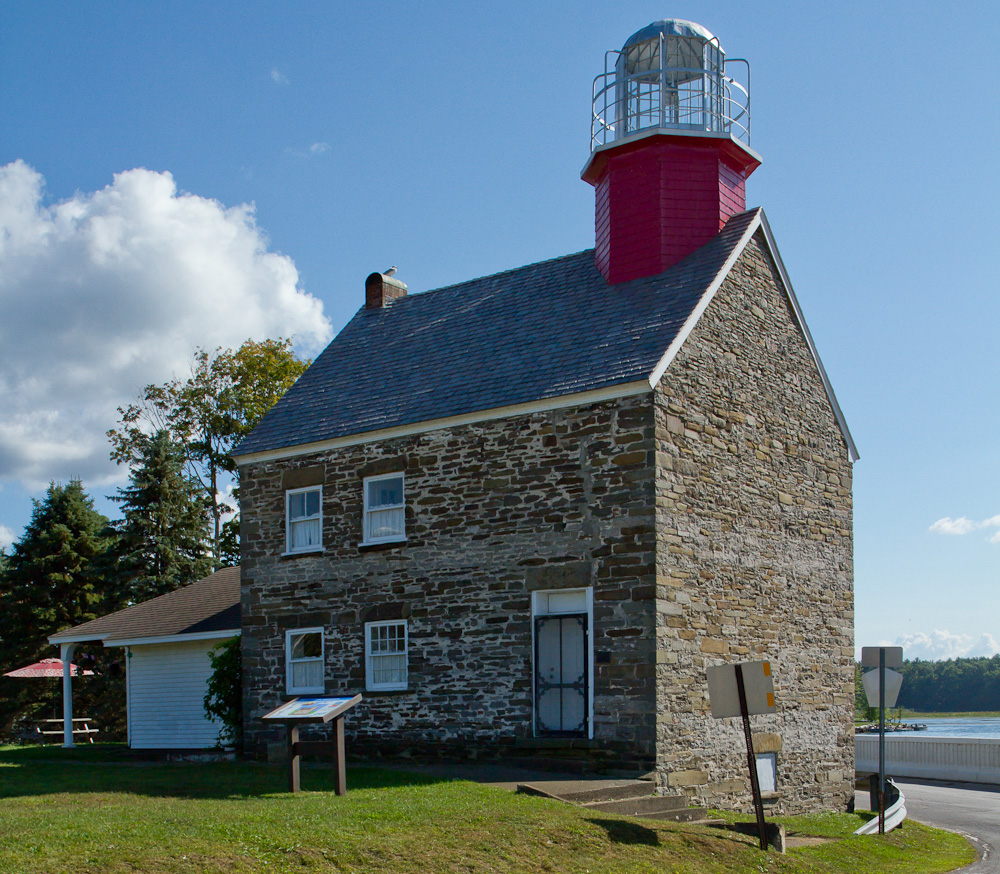
Selkirk Lighthouse

Land for the Port Ontario Lighthouse Reservation was purchased from Sylvester and Daniel Brown by the Federal Government on September 1, 1837. Jacob Gould, Superintendent of Lighthouses on Lake Ontario, publicized for bids about a week after the purchase. The specifications included dimensions of the lumber and weight of the copper sheets, as well as the materials and dimensions of the house and an outhouse. There were eight lamps in the tower which originally burned whale oil.

The bid was awarded to Joseph Gibbs and Abner French, local contractors. Most of the stonework was accomplished by Jabez Meacham, using stone from a nearby quarry. The wrought iron railings that encircled the birdcage lantern room were formed by John Box, a local blacksmith. The total cost was about $3,000.00.

== Keepers ==
- Lewis Conant, August 1838 – July 1849
- Lucius B. Cole, July 1849 – October 1854
- Charles M. Lewis, October 1854 – March 1857
- A. H. Weed, March 1857 – 1858

== Deactivation ==
Commerce was booming at the time the lighthouse was constructed. Two piers were built at the mouth of the Salmon River to improve the harbor. A canal was proposed to connect the Salmon River to Lake Oneida and the Erie Canal. Unfortunately, the canal was never built, and Selkirk faded in importance. With an official beacon no longer justified, the lighthouse was deactivated in 1858.

== Selkirk Lighthouse Hotel ==
On October 16, 1895, Leopold Joh, a German émigré, purchased the lighthouse at auction from the US Government for $155. The lighthouse was first used as Joh's private residence before it was incorporated into a hotel complex that Joh started to develop in 1899. While on an errand procuring refreshments for his guests, Joh died of a massive coronary on August 21, 1907. His family continued to operate the hotel until it was sold to the Heckle family in 1916.

The Heckles eventually doubled the size of the hotel and the property attracted vacationers from as far away as New York City and Philadelphia. The hotel and nearby marina was purchased by the Walker Family in 1987 and then again by the Barnell Family in 2014. Multiple upgrades to the entire property have been made, including complete renovations of the Lighthouse and all 3 cottages, a new boat launch ramp and new state-of-the-art floating docks.

The former hotel, boarded up since an explosion in 1987, could not be restored and was razed in early 2016.

== Reactivation ==
In 1989, a Coast Guard-approved solar light was installed in the lantern room. On August 6 of that year, the Selkirk Lighthouse was reactivated as a Class II navigation aid.

== See also ==
Other lighthouses retaining their bird-cage lanterns:

- Prudence Island Lighthouse, Rhode Island
- Baileys Harbor Lighthouse, Wisconsin
- Waugoshance Light, Michigan
