= The Ridges Sanctuary =

Nature preserve in Door County, Wisconsin, US

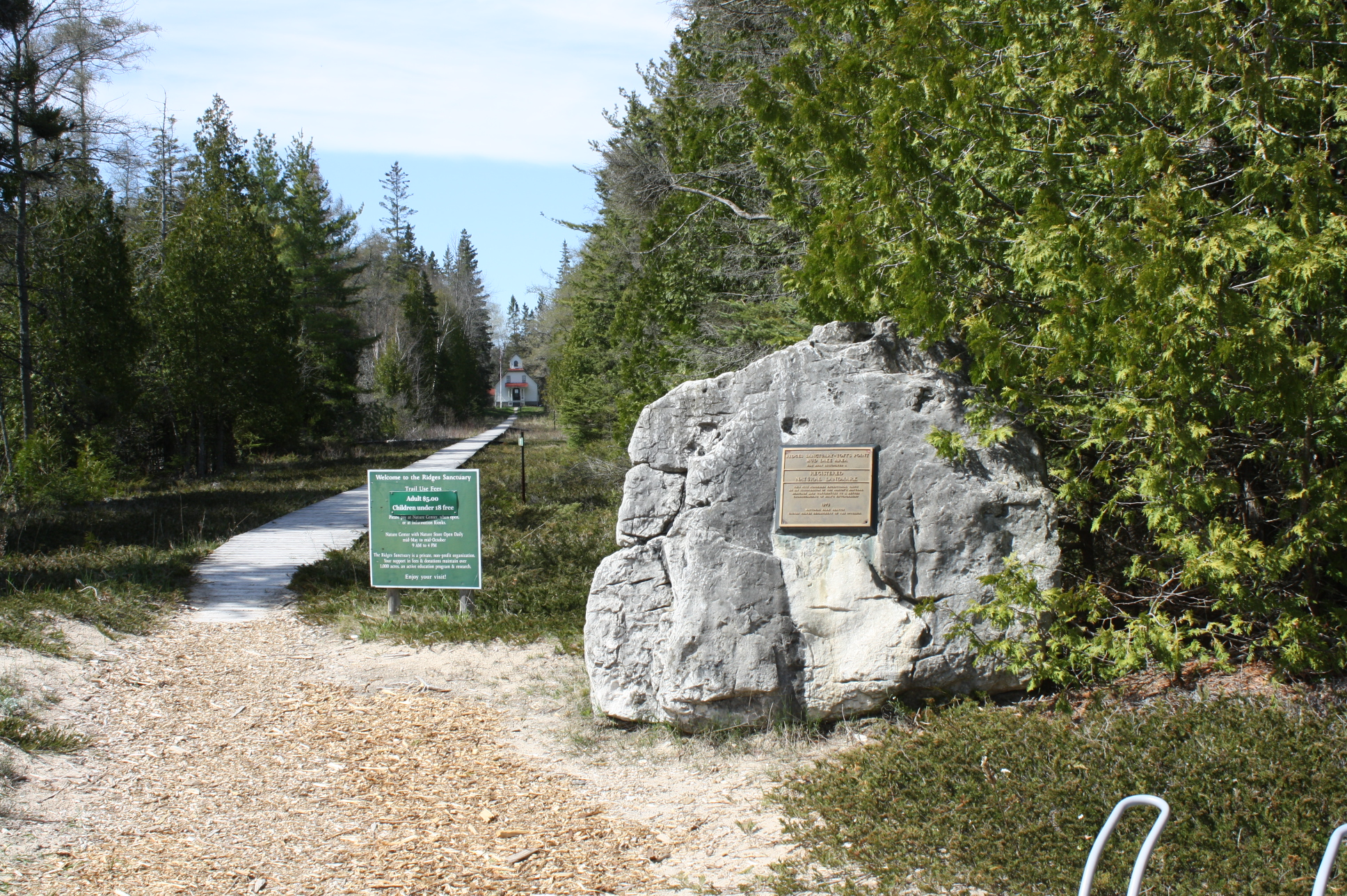
- Welcome sign and National Natural Landmark sign

- Location within Wisconsin
- Location: Baileys Harbor, Wisconsin, United States
- Coordinates: 45.0729°N 87.1187°W
- Area: 1,600 acres (650 ha)
- Established: 1937
- Website: ridgessanctuary.org

U.S. National Natural Landmark
- Designated: 1967

The Ridges Sanctuary is a 1,600-acre (650 ha) nature preserve and land trust in Baileys Harbor, Wisconsin. It is listed as a National Natural Landmark, Important Bird Area and Wisconsin State Natural Area. It was founded in 1937 and was the first land trust in the state.

The sanctuary is also home to the Baileys Harbor Range Lights, which were added to the National Register of Historic Places in 1989.

The Cook-Albert Fuller Nature Center opened in 2015. The 7,400-square foot facility is LEED certified, and includes displays about the preserve's karst topography, wildflowers, plants, animals and the history of the site's founding.

The sanctuary includes a small amount of the raw humus rendzina soil type, which is globally uncommon. and is also found in the Marshall's Point State Natural Area, a residential development not open to the public.

== Orchid project ==
Although the sanctuary is home to wild orchids, it also operates an orchid restoration project to cultivate and introduce rare orchids into otherwise natural plant communities. 25 native orchid species are currently kept at the Ridges. A 1998 survey of wild, native orchids was carried out in response to continued theft of the sanctuary orchids. 28 species were identified.

== Climate ==
The Ridges Sanctuary State Natural Area

Climate chart (precipitation, max. and min. temperature)
J	F	M	A	M	J	J	A	S	O	N	D
63 −4 −5	52 −6 −8	49 0 −3	97 3 1	86 7 3	91 14 9	105 15 14	96 18 17	96 16 15	107 10 6	80 4 4	57 3 −2
- █ Average max. and min. temperatures in °C
- █ Precipitation totals in mm
Imperial conversion
J	F	M	A	M	J	J	A	S	O	N	D
2.5 25 23	2 21 18	1.9 32 27	3.8 37 34	3.4 45 37	3.6 57 48	4.1 59 57	3.8 64 63	3.8 61 59	4.2 50 43	3.1 39 39	2.2 37 28
- █ Average max. and min. temperatures in °F
- █ Precipitation totals in inches

== Gallery ==
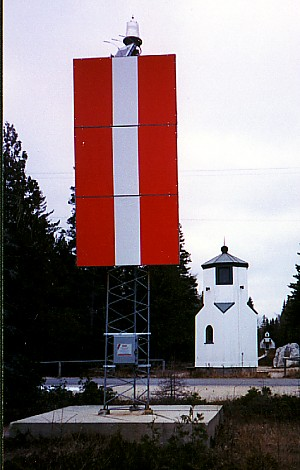
Baileys Harbor Range Lights

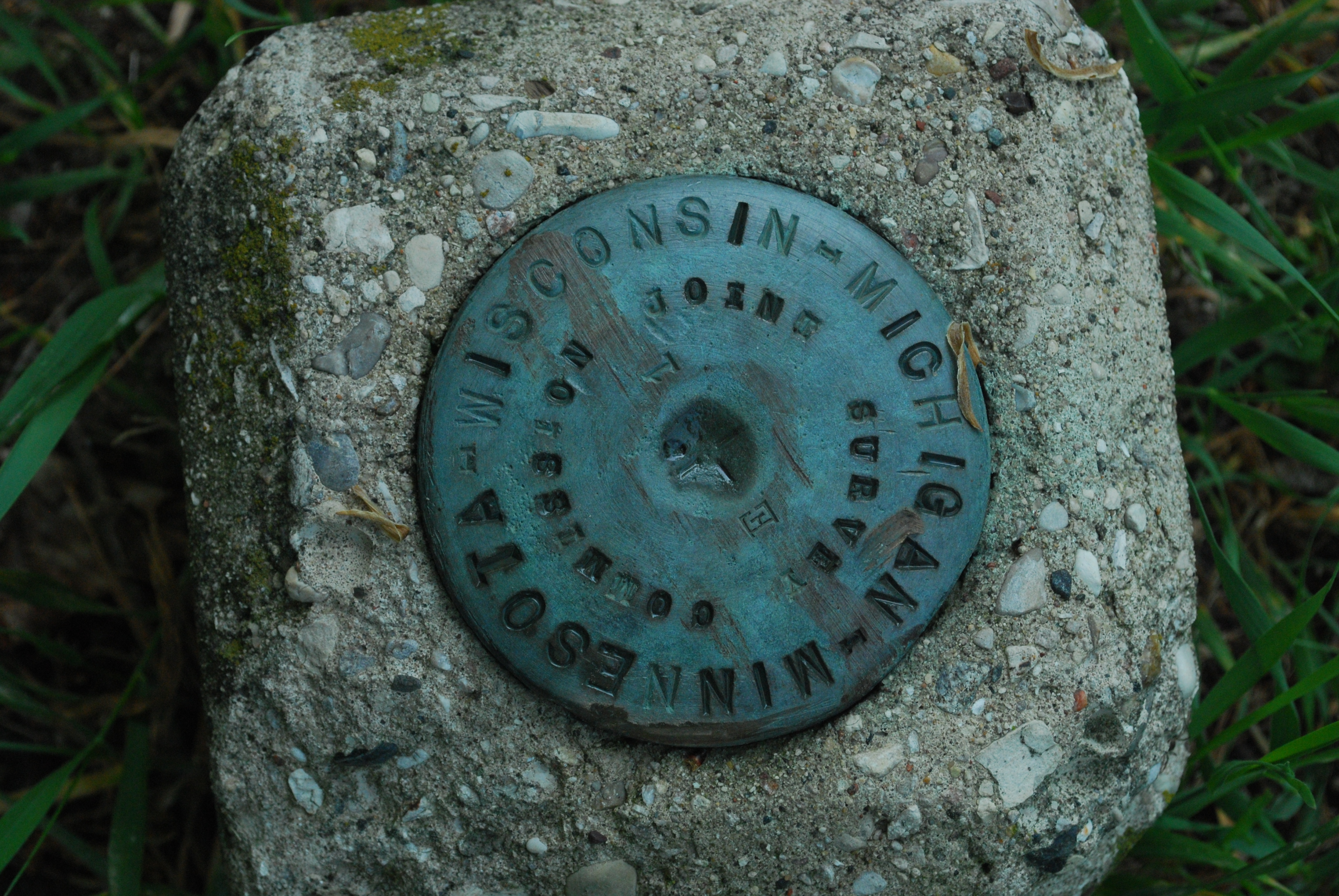
Survey marker in the sanctuary

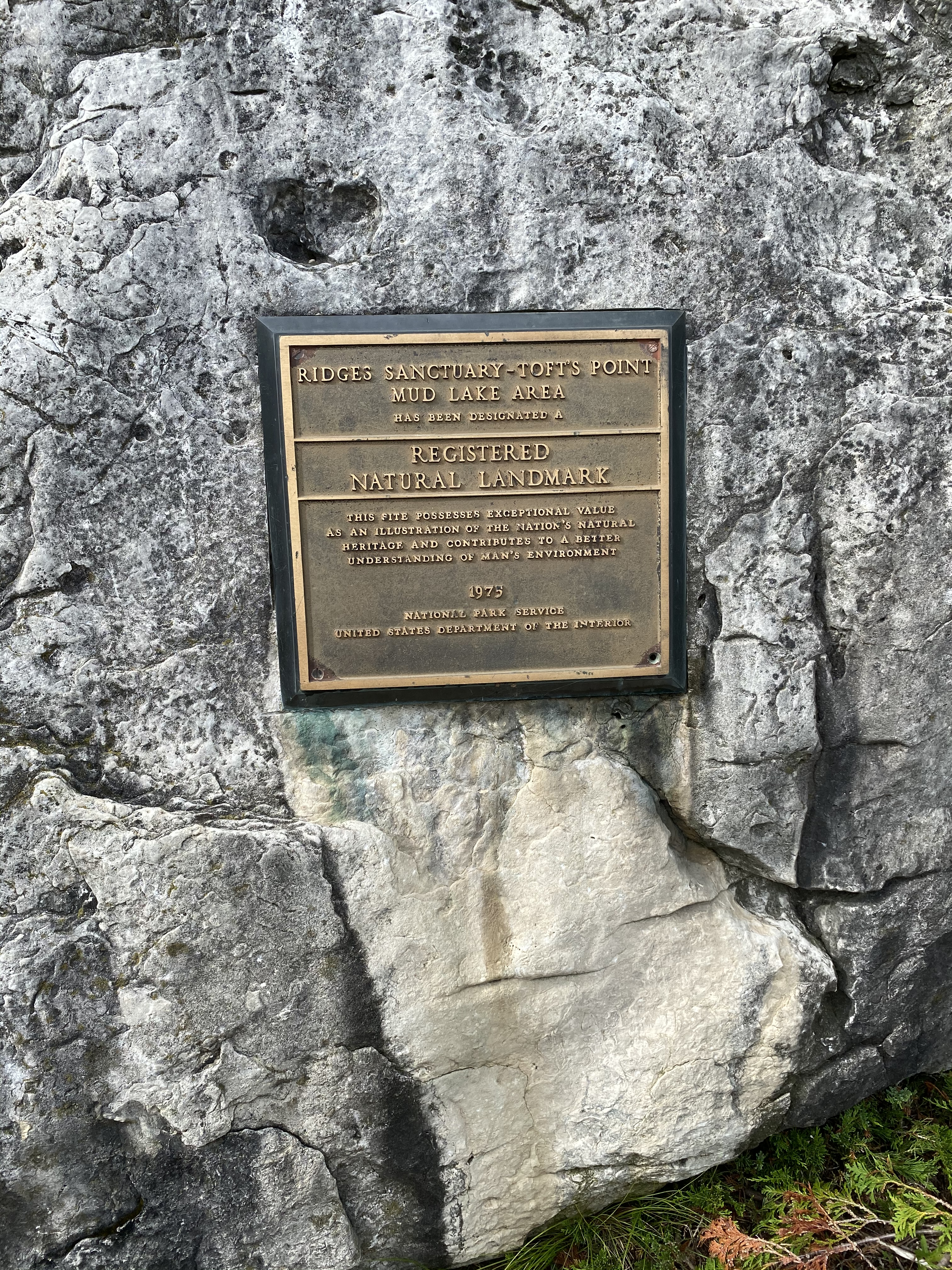
Plaque near the base of the range lights

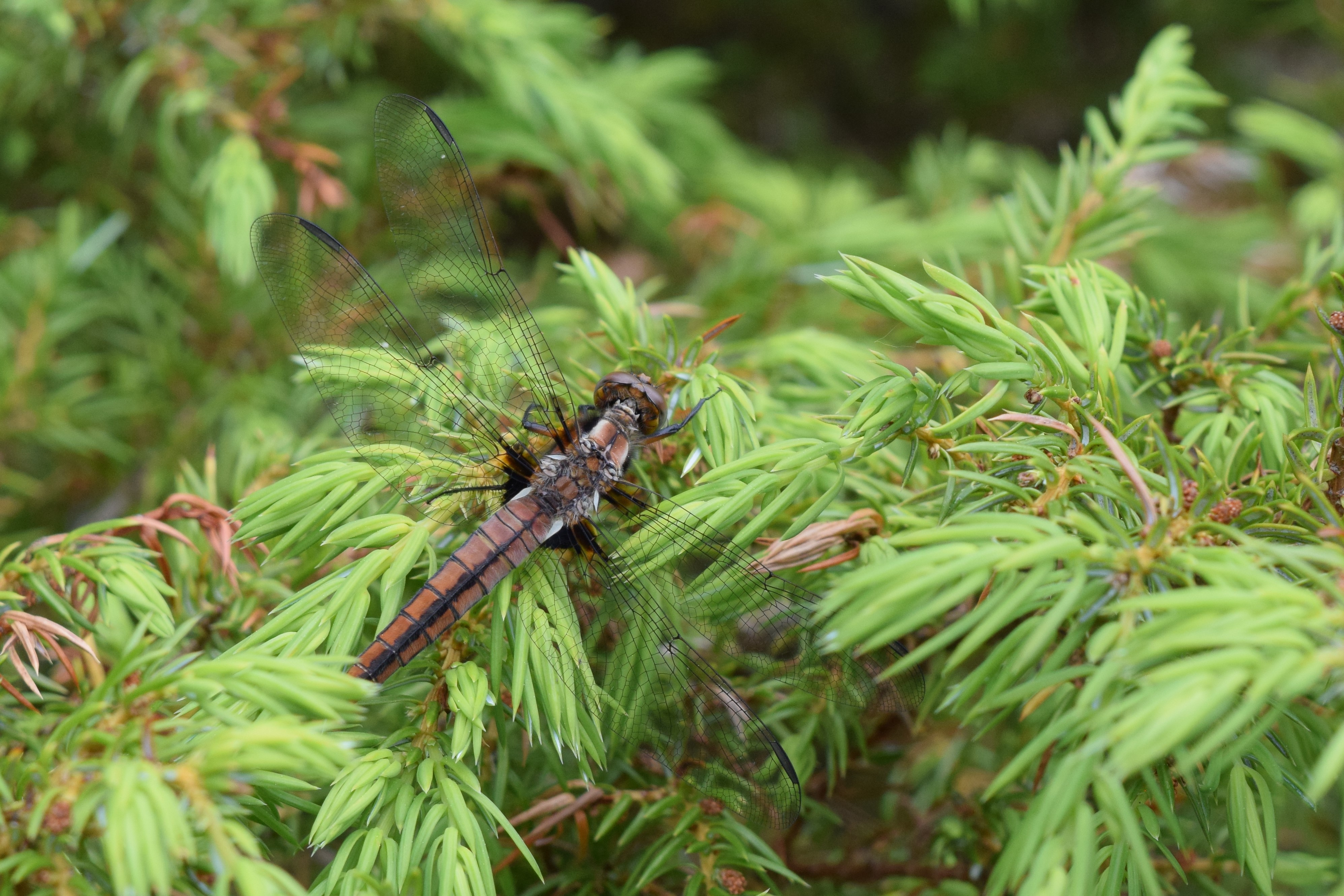
Chalk-fronted corporal dragonfly in June at the Ridges

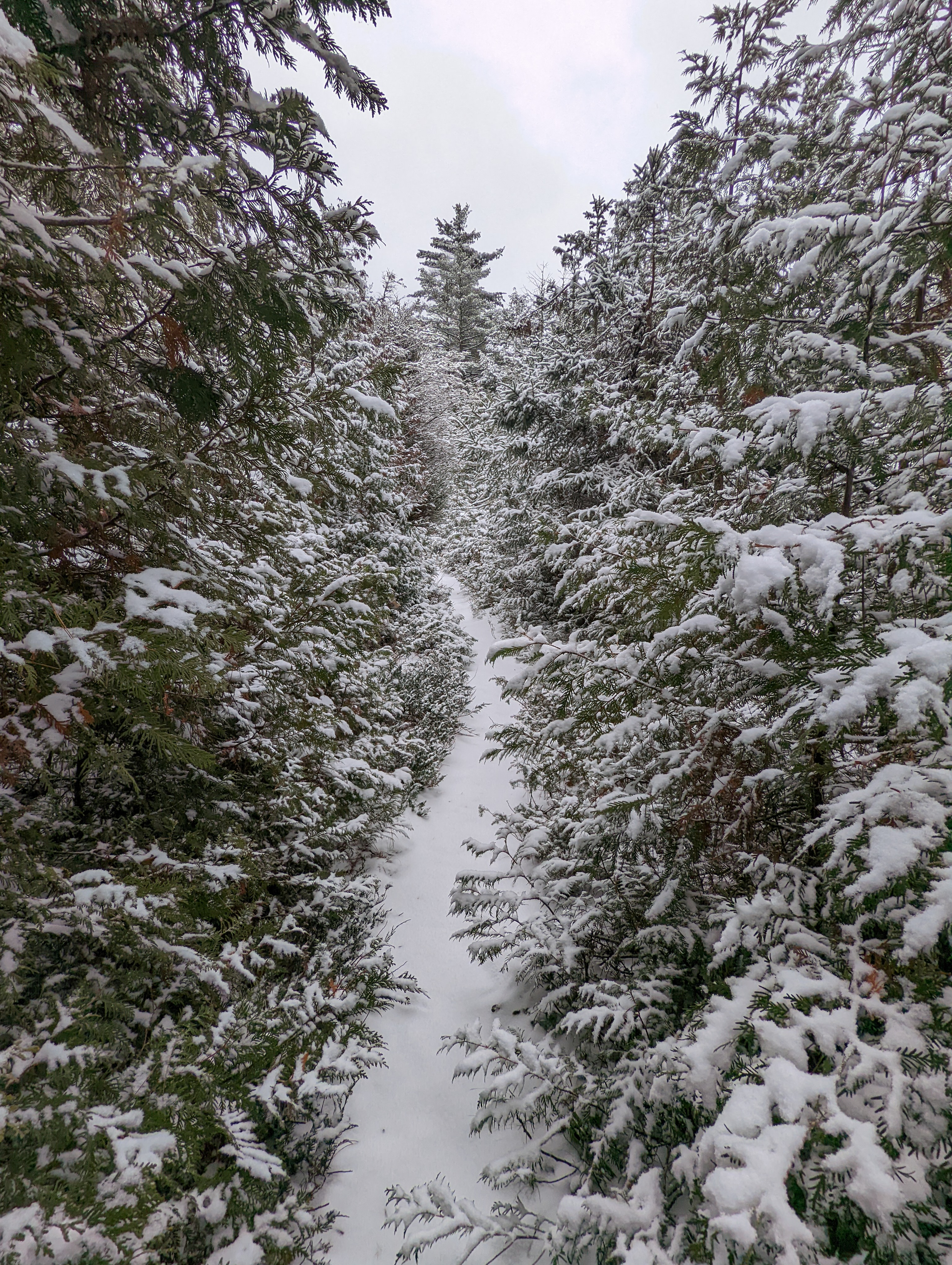
Trail at the sanctuary, November 27, 2021

== See also ==
- Jens Jensen
- Emma Toft
