= List of lighthouses in North Carolina =

This is a list of lighthouses in North Carolina.

Name	Image	Location	Coordinates	Year first lit	Automated	Year deactivated	Current Lens	Focal Height
Bald Head Light		Bald Head Island	33°52′24.5″N 78°0′24.5″W	1794 (First); 1817 (Current)	1985 (Relit)	Active (Inactive: 1935–1985)	None	110 ft (34 m)
Bodie Island Light		Nags Head	35.8185°N 75.5633°W	1847 (First); 1872 (Current)	1940	Active	First-order Fresnel	156 ft (48 m)
Bogue Banks Light		Bogue Banks	34.694395°N 76.677605°W	1855	Never	1862 (Destroyed)	None	50ft (15.2m)
Campbell Island Light	None Known	Wilmington	34.115344°N 77.940941°W	1849	Never	1865 (Destroyed)	None	25 ft (7.6 m)
Cape Fear Light		Cape Fear	33.8927°N 78.0348°W	1903	Never	1958 (Demolished)	None	Unknown
Cape Hatteras Light		Buxton	35°15′01.92″N 75°31′43.74″W	1803 (First); 1870 (Current)	1950	Active	DCB-224	187 ft (57 m)
Cape Lookout Light		Cape Lookout	34°36′19″N 76°32′10″W	1812 (First); 1859 (Current)	1950	Active	LED	Unknown
Croatan Shoal Light		Croatan Sound	35.945000°N 75.778056°W	1863 (First) 1887 (Last)	Never	1864 (Destroyed)1930s	None	Unknown
Currituck Beach Light		Corolla	36.376667°N 75.830833°W	1875	1939	Active	First-order Fresnel	158 ft (48 m)
Diamond Shoal Light		Offshore	35°9′12″N 75°17′48″W	1966	1977	2001	None	125 ft (38 m)
Federal Point Light	N/A	Kure Beach	Unknown	1817(First); 1866 (Last)	Never	1879 (Destroyed in 1881)	None	Unknown
Frying Pan Shoals Light		Offshore	33°29′N 77°35′W	1964	1979	2003	None	Unknown
Gull Shoal Light	N/A	Pamlico Sound	35.366138°N 75.957323°W	1890	Never	Unknown (Destroyed)	None	44 ft (13 m)
Hatteras Beacon		Buxton	Unknown	1855	Never	1898 (Removed)	None	Unknown
Laurel Point Light		Laurel Point	N/A	1880	Never	1950s (Demolished)	None	Unknown
Long Point Beacon Light		Currituck	N/A	1901	Never	Unknown (Destroyed)	None	Unknown
Neuse River Light		Vandemere	N/A	1828	Never	Unknown (Destroyed)	None	35 ft (11 m)
North River Light	N/A	Albemarle Sound	N/A	1866	Never	1917 (Moved in 1920)	None	Unknown
Oak Island Light		Oak Island	33.8929°N 78.035°W	1849 (First); 1958 (Current)	Always	Active	LED	169 ft (52 m)
Ocracoke Light		Ocracoke	35°6′32.3″N 75°59′9.8″W	1798 (First); 1823 (Current)	1955	Active	Fourth-order Fresnel	75 ft (23 m)
Pamlico Point Shoal Light		Mesic	N/A	1828 (First); 1891 (Last)	Never	1950s (Demolished)	None	Unknown
Price Creek Light		Southport	33°56′9″N 77°59′23″W	1851	Never	1865	None	31 ft (9.4 m)
Roanoke Marshes Light		Croatan Sound	35°48′40″N 75°42′02″W	1831 (First); 1877 (Last)	Never	1955^{A} (Destroyed)	None	Unknown
Roanoke River Light		Albemarle Sound	36.056029°N 76.610905°W	1867 (First); 1903 (Current)	Never	1941^{B} (Preserved)	None	35 ft (11 m)
Wade Point Light		Pasquotank River (Entrance)	N/A	1855 (First); 1899 (Last)	Never	1950s (Destroyed)	None	Unknown

== Notes ==
A. A replica of the 1877 lighthouse was built in 2004.
B. In 2003, a replica of the original 1866 lighthouse was built.
