= Baileys Harbor Range Lights =

Baileys Harbor Range Front Light
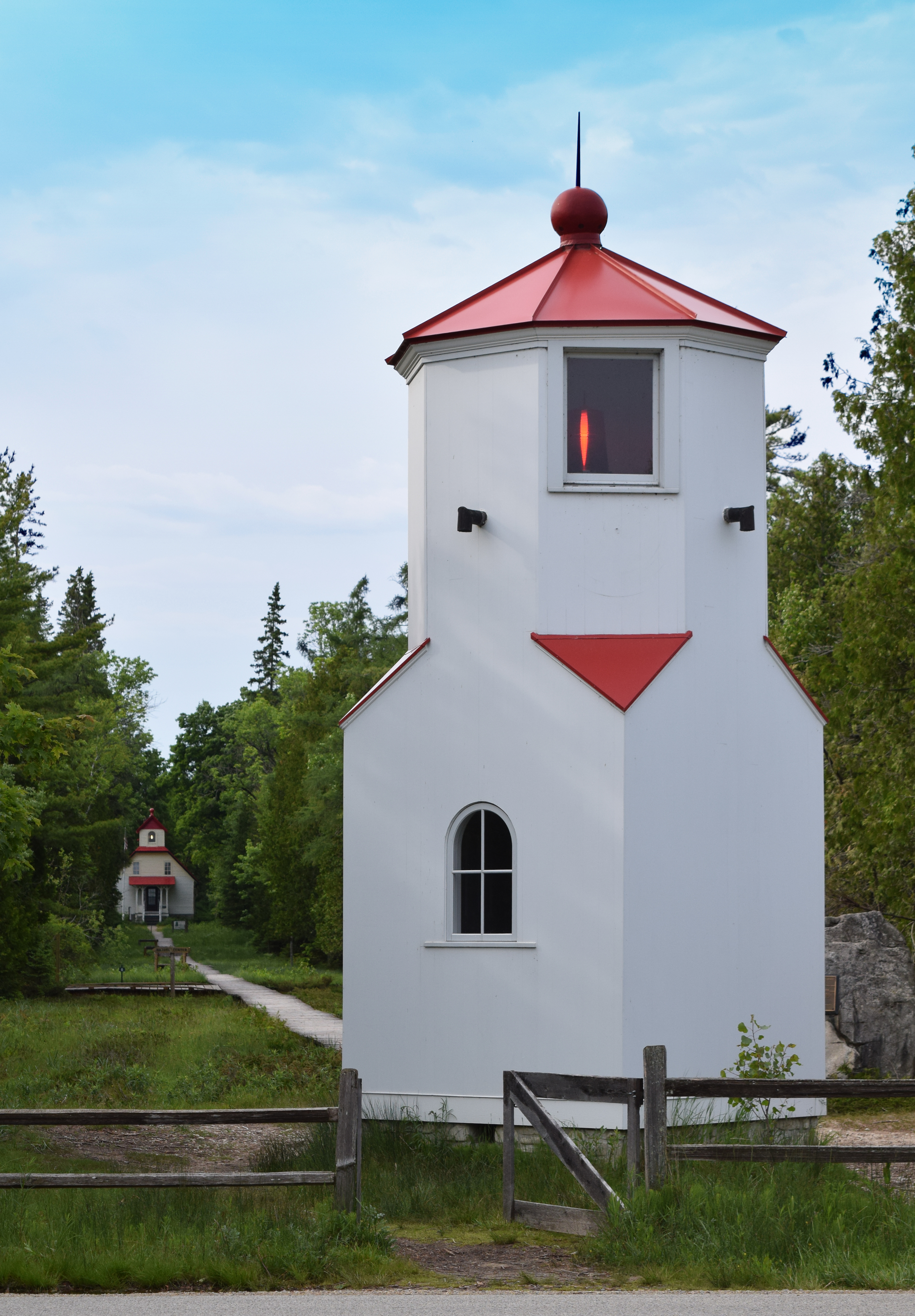
- Location: Baileys Harbor, Wisconsin
- Coordinates: 45°04′13″N 87°07′11″W

Tower
- Constructed: 1869
- Foundation: Field stone
- Construction: Wood
- Automated: 1930
- Height: 21 feet (6.4 m)
- Shape: Square base, upper is octagonal
- Markings: KRW
- Heritage: National Register of Historic Places contributing property

Light
- First lit: 1869
- Deactivated: 1969-2015
- Focal height: 7 m (23 ft)
- Lens: Fifth order Fresnel (1897) (original), LED (current)
- Characteristic: F R
- Baileys Harbor Range Rear Light
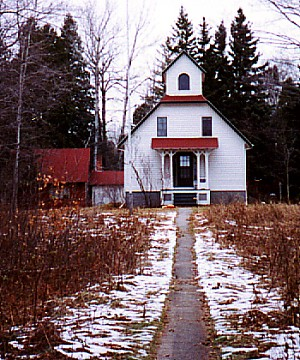
- Rear range light
- Coordinates: 45°04′22″N 87°07′16″W
- Constructed: 1870
- Foundation: Field stone
- Construction: Wood
- Automated: 1930
- Height: 30 feet (9.1 m)
- Shape: Square, atop a house
- Markings: White w/black and red markings
- Heritage: National Register of Historic Places contributing property
- First lit: 1870
- Deactivated: 1969-2015
- Focal height: 36 feet (11 m)
- Lens: Fifth order Fresnel (original), LED (current)
- Characteristic: directional mark
- Baileys Harbor Directional Light
- Foundation: Concrete
- Construction: Metal skeleton tower with red/white/red dayboard
- Height: 21 m (69 ft)
- First lit: 1969
- Deactivated: 2015
- Focal height: 21 m (69 ft)
- Characteristic: White light Flashing every 2.5 seconds, with a higher intensity beam on a bearing of 340°
- Baileys Harbor Range Light
- U.S. National Register of Historic Places
- U.S. Historic district
- Location within Wisconsin Location within the United States
- Location: Roughly Co. Rd. Q, Ridges Rd., and WI 57, Baileys Harbor, Wisconsin
- Coordinates: 45°4′19″N 87°7′13″W
- Area: 5.4 acres (2.2 ha)
- Built: 1869
- Architect: Breitbach, Andrew
- NRHP reference No.: 89001466
- Added to NRHP: September 21, 1989

The Baileys Harbor Range Lights are a pair of lighthouses arranged in a range light configuration, located near Baileys Harbor in Door County, Wisconsin, United States.

== History ==
The range lights replaced the Baileys Harbor Lighthouse in 1870 at a cost of $6,000. They are approximately 980 feet (300 m) apart and aligned on a 340° bearing line to guide boats safely into the harbor. It was added to the National Register of Historic Places in 1989, as reference number 89001466 as the Baileys Harbor Range Light. Currently part of the Ridges wildlife sanctuary, which is listed on the List of National Natural Landmarks in Wisconsin. The grounds may be visited and guided tours are given during peak tourist seasons.

The Bailey's Harbor Range Light is listed on the National Register of Historic Places, Reference #89001466, as BAILEYS HARBOR RANGE LIGHT. It is also on the State List/Inventory as of 1988.

After 1969, the Coast Guard removed lighting equipment from the original buildings and replaced them with a single directional light on the beach. In 1990, the Ridges Sanctuary took possession of the buildings and began restoring them; this was completed during the 1990s, when both buildings were rewired to supply electricity to the lamps. A skeleton tower, which was listed in Volume VII of the United States Coast Guard light list, provided shipping guidance until 2015, when the original range lights were updated with modern LED lamps and brought back online.

== Gallery ==
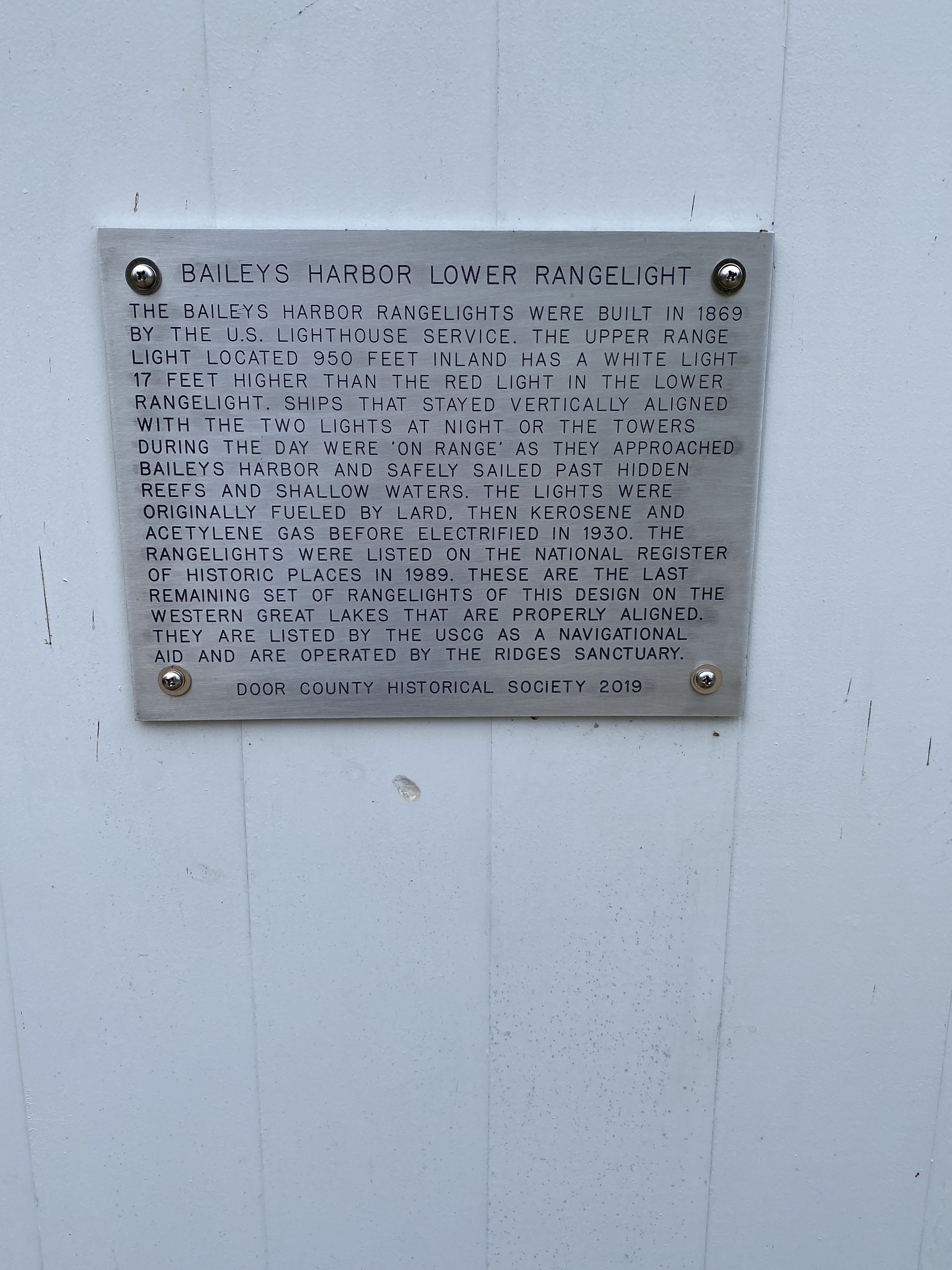
Bailey's Harbor Lower Range Light plaque.

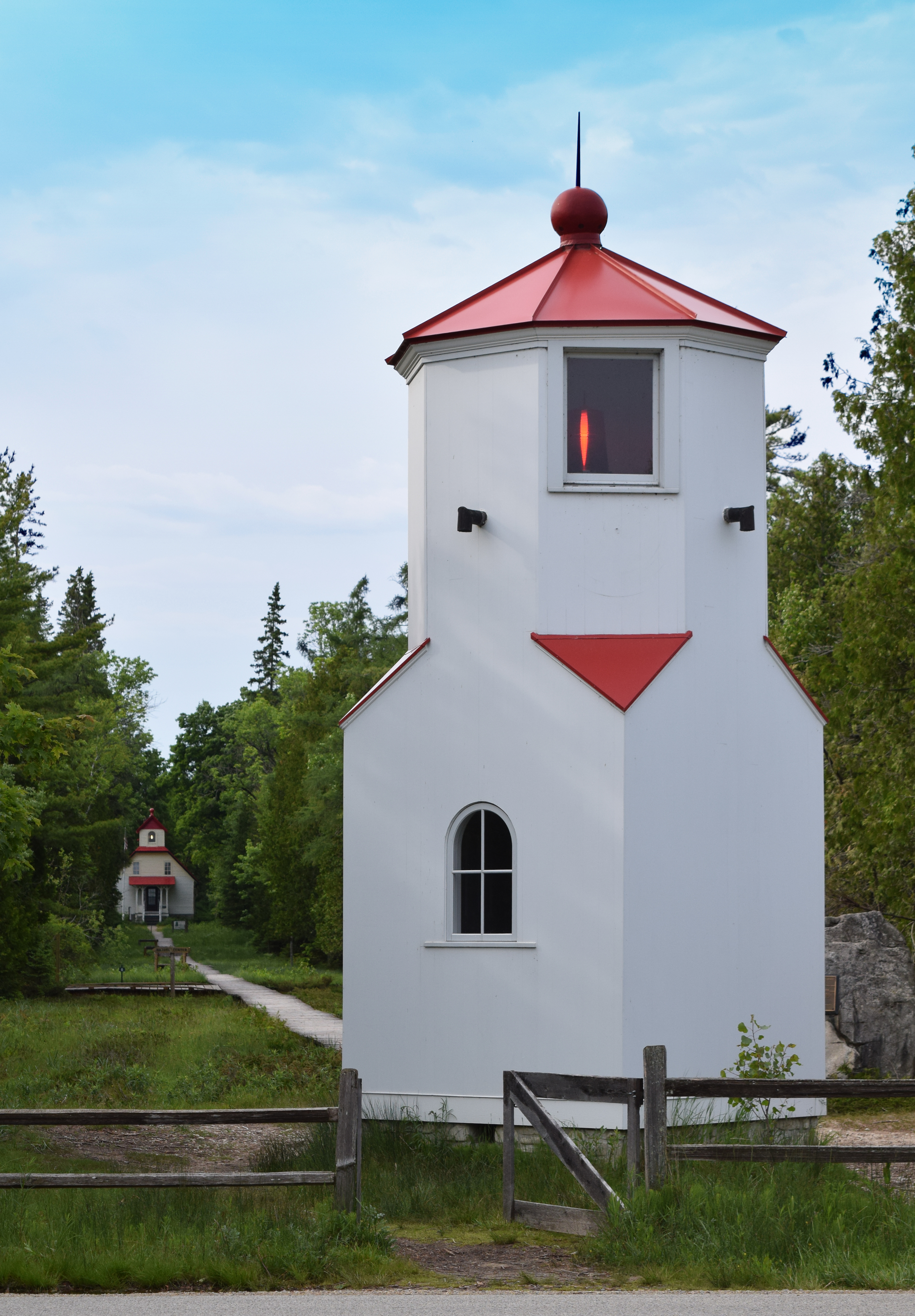
Lower Range Light with skeleton tower removed.

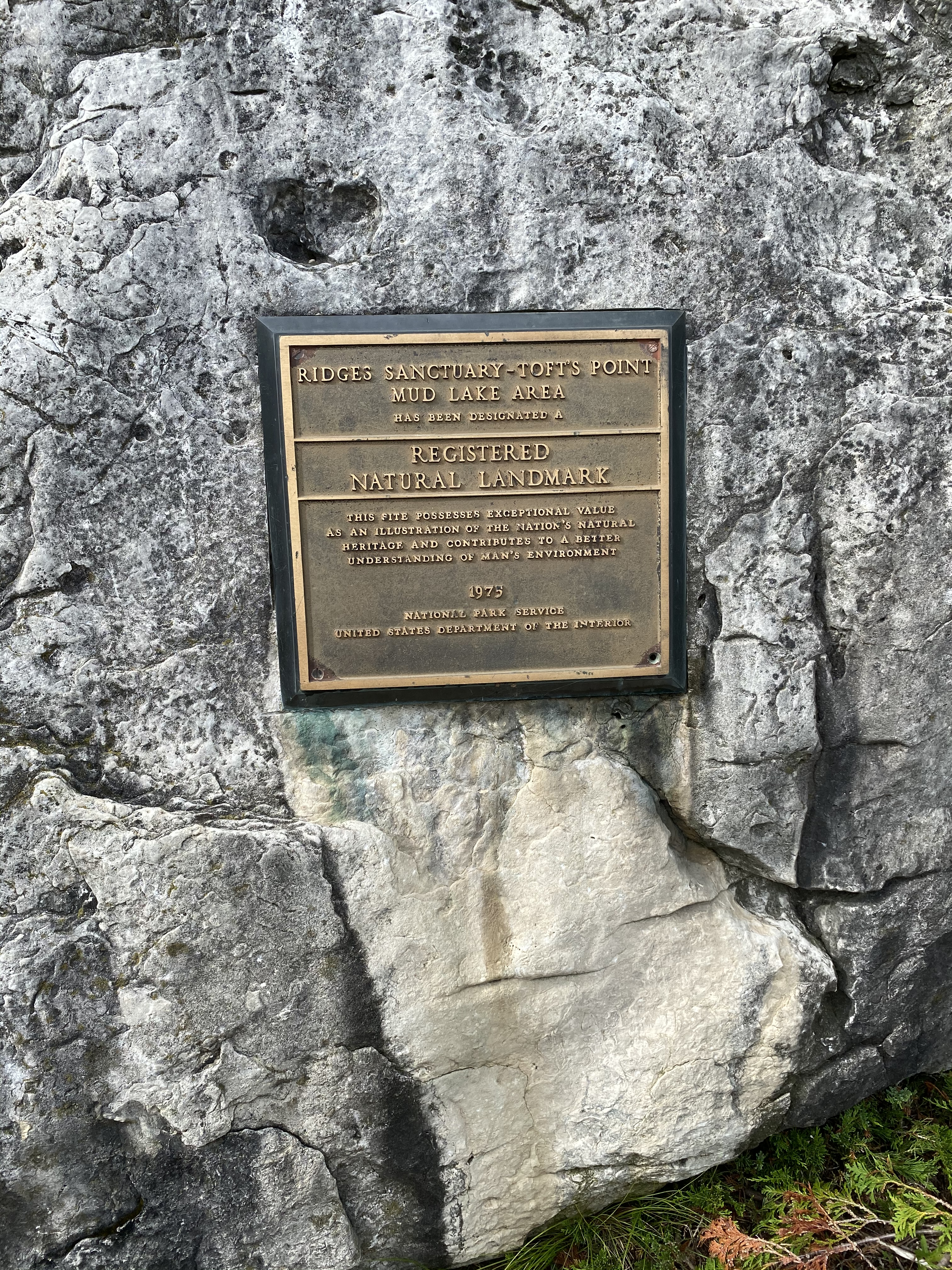
Plaque at the base of the lower range light for The Ridges Sanctuary.
