= Price Creek Light =

Lighthouse in North Carolina, US

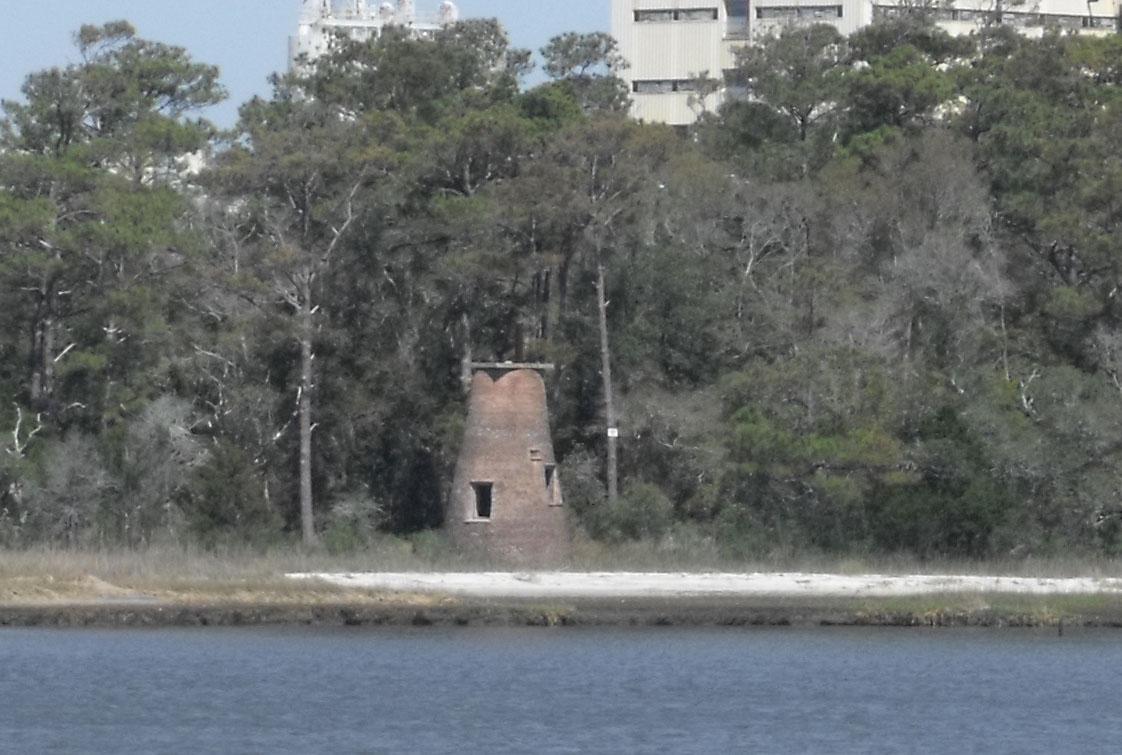
- Location: Southport, North Carolina
- Coordinates: 33°56′9″N 77°59′23″W

Tower
- Constructed: 1850
- Construction: Brick
- Height: 26 feet (7.9 m)
- Shape: Conical

Light
- First lit: January 4, 1851
- Deactivated: ca. 1860s
- Focal height: 31 feet (9.4 m)
- Lens: 8 lamps with 18-inch (460 mm) reflectors
- Range: 11 nmi (13 mi)
- Characteristic: Fixed white light

The Price Creek Lighthouse, also known as the Price's Creek Lighthouse, is a structure located near Southport, North Carolina. It was one of two range lights at Price Creek in a series of lights to guide ships from Cape Fear to Wilmington, North Carolina.

== History ==
On August 14, 1848, $35,500 was appropriated for the construction of seven beacons and one lightship along the Cape Fear River. In March 1850, the US Collectors office placed an advertisement for construction proposals for two lights at Price's Creek. The Wood Brothers, John C. Wood and Robert B. Wood, two noted Wilmington brickmasons, were contracted in April 1850 to build the lights at Price’s Creek, and were paid a sum of $5,660 (~$237,000 in 2026) for the job.

In 1850, a two story (including the attic) brick lightkeeper's house with an iron Bird-cage lantern was built as one of the lights. The keeper's house was one story, with an attic and cellar, and consisted of two parlor rooms separated by an entry with a staircase that went to the attic. The attic was divided into two chambers, with stairs in the middle leading to a hatch to the lantern room. Attached to the house was a kitchen, with a fireplace, oven, and sink. The kitchen led out to a 1,000 gallon cistern, which was covered by a wood deck with railings. This house suffered severe storm damage, and locals carted off many of its bricks.

The second range light is a conical brick tower originally 20 feet (6 m) tall with a base diameter of 17 feet (5 m). The light was approximately 25 feet (8 m) above sea level. The bricks had been imported from England. It originally had eight lamps with silver plated reflectors measuring 18 inches (46 cm) in diameter.In 1855 the lamps were replaced with a 6th order Fresnel lens that produced a fixed white light.

The lights at Price's Creek were first lit on the night of January 4, 1851. The lights at Price's Creek formed a range with the channel around Horse Shoe Shoal, and guided mariners sailing through the New Inlet. The lights would operate regularly until the outbreak of the American Civil War in 1861, when Confederate forces were ordered to extinguish all lights on the lower Cape Fear river. While out of official service, the lights would sometimes be momentarily lit to aid blockade runners. During the American Civil War, the keeper's quarters served the Confederacy as a signal house to communicate between Fort Fisher and Fort Caswell.

The tower suffered damage from shells during the Civil War, and was not relit after the war had ended. At some point after 1917 the ruined lantern was removed, and the tower's height was extended to 26 feet. An iron ladder was attached to the outside of the light, leading to a square platform on the top with railings. By 1947 the iron ladder had almost completely rusted away, and the walls of the light were missing many bricks. Colonel J.S. Crawford bought the three acre plot including the lighthouse, with plans to build a house there and fix up the old light. A new wooden staircase was added to the light, and the brickwork was repaired, with new windows being put in.

The surviving range light and foundation of the keeper's quarters are located at the edge of Archer Daniels Midland's industrial site on the bank of the Cape Fear River. It is currently in private hands, but can be best viewed from the Southport-Fort Fisher ferry or from the ferryboat landing at Southport.

== Pictures ==
- Rare 1939 Postcard Showing Price's Creek Front-Range Light
- Rare 1908 Postcard Showing Price's Creek Rear-Range Light and Keeper's House
