= Peninsula Center, Wisconsin =

- Unincorporated community
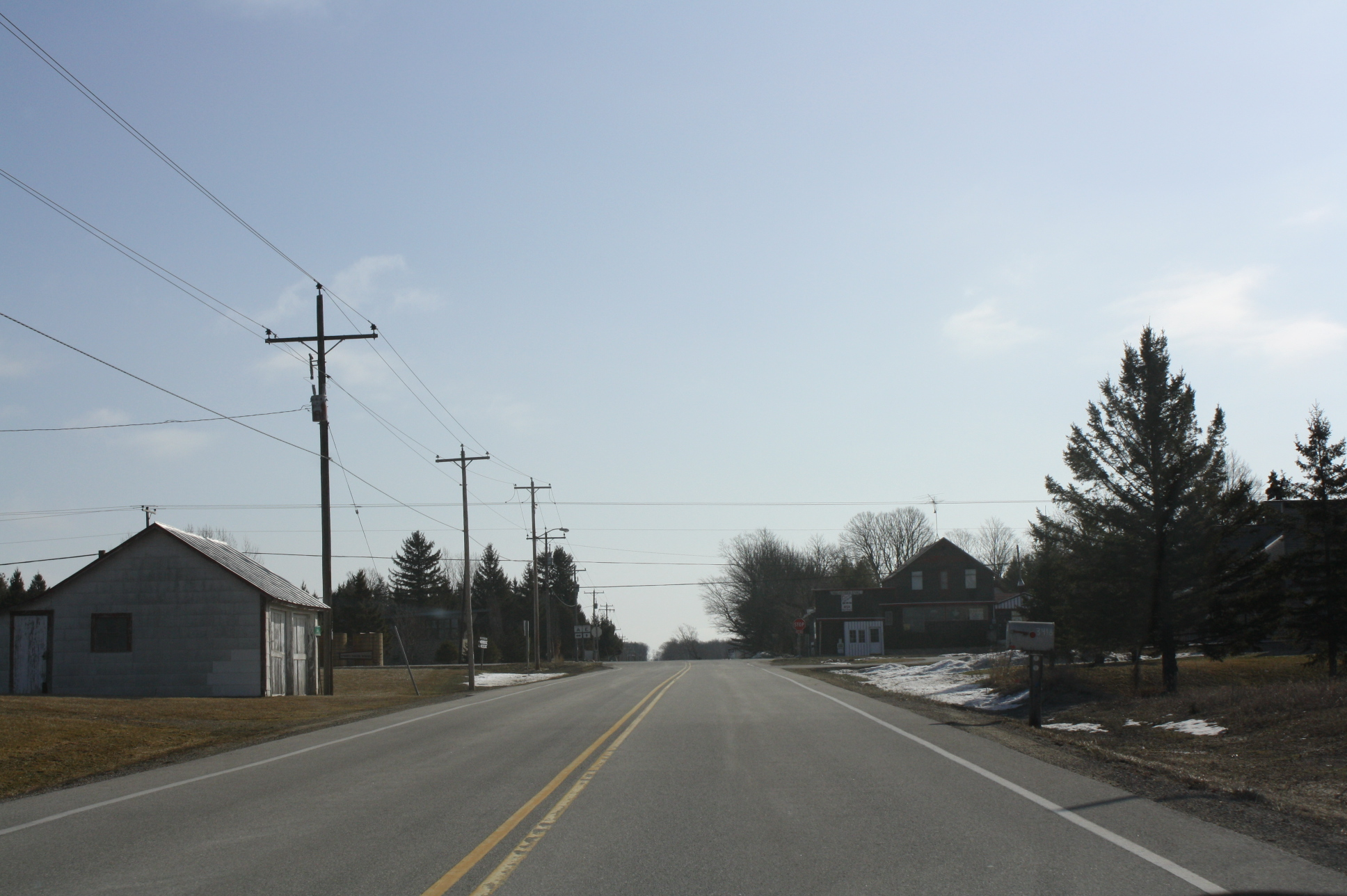
- Looking east at Peninsula Center

- Location within Wisconsin Location within the United States
- Coordinates: 45°03′16″N 87°11′39″W
- Country: United States
- State: Wisconsin
- County: Door
- Town: Baileys Harbor
- Elevation: 715 ft (218 m)
- Time zone: UTC-6 (Central (CST))
  - Summer (DST): UTC-5 (CDT)
- Area code: 920
- GNIS feature ID: 1571173

Peninsula Center is an unincorporated community in the town of Baileys Harbor in Door County, Wisconsin, United States. Peninsula Center is located at the junction of County Trunk Highway A (CTH-A) and CTH-E, which is 4 miles (6.4 km) east of Egg Harbor.

== Aerial view ==
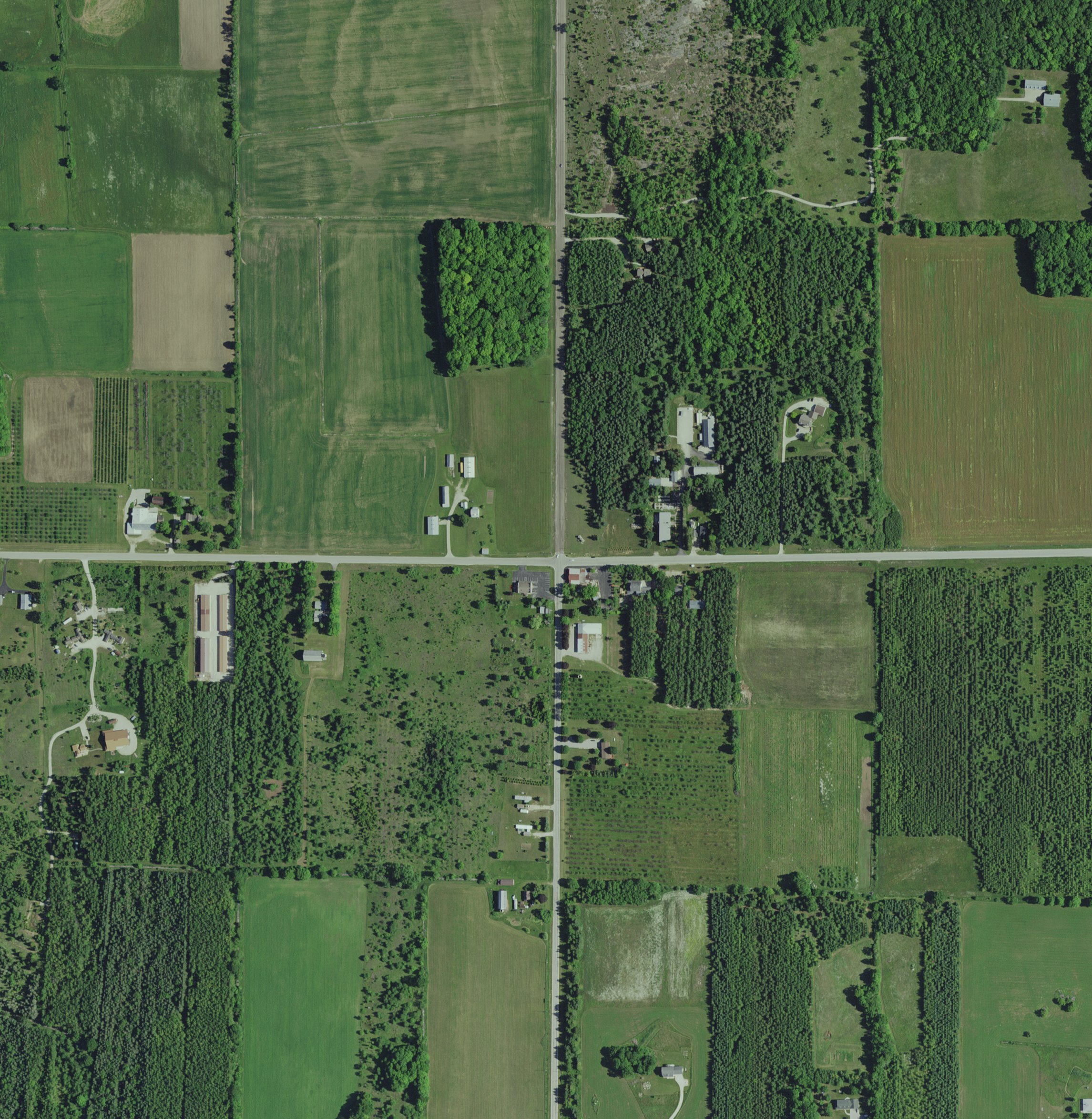
CTH-A runs north and south, while CTH-E runs east and west
