= Ned Point Light =

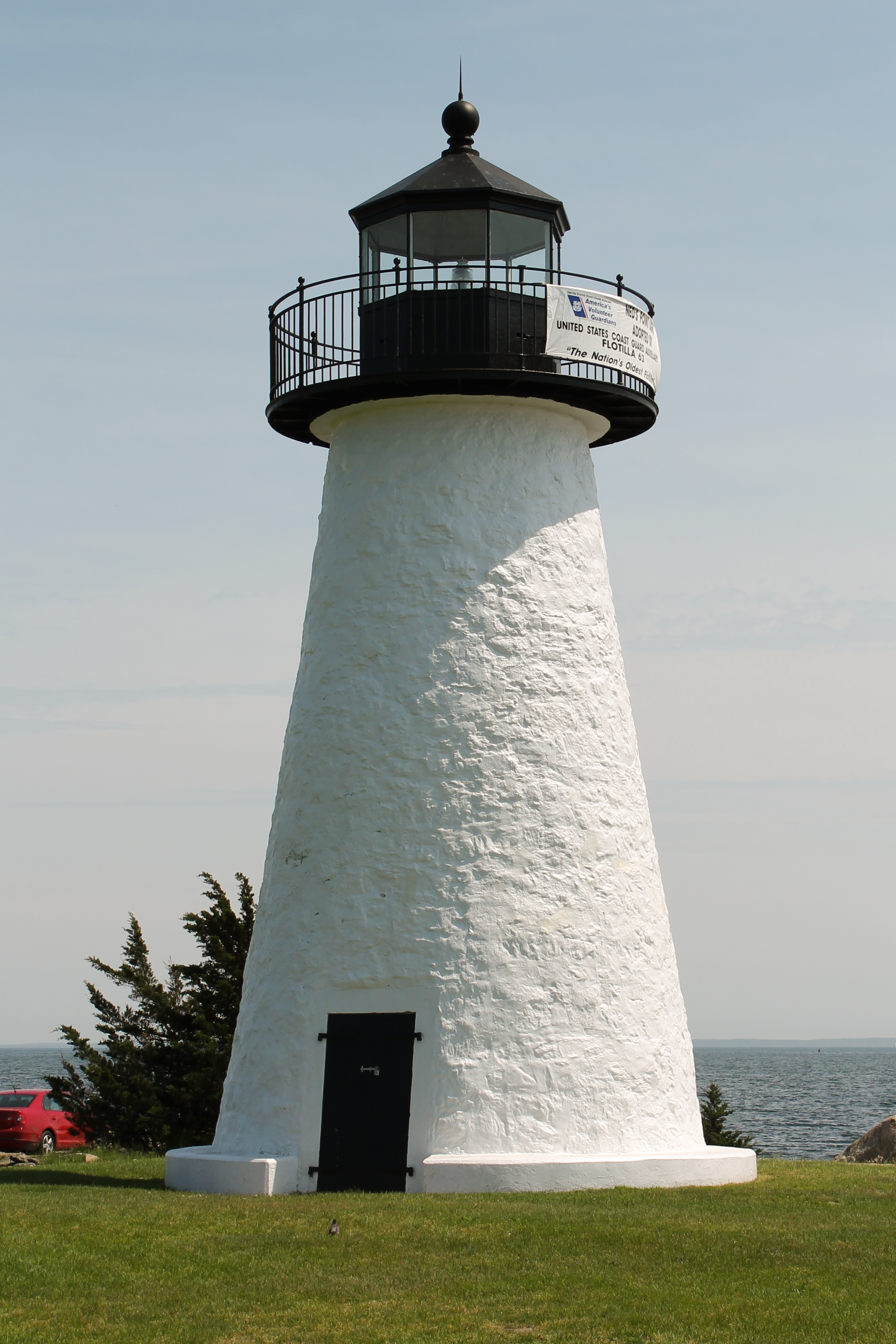
- Ned's Point Light in 2012
- Location: Mattapoisett, Massachusetts
- Coordinates: 41°39′3.133″N 70°47′44.336″W

Tower
- Constructed: 1838
- Foundation: Natural / Emplaced
- Construction: Stone
- Automated: 1923
- Height: 39 feet (12 m)
- Shape: Conical
- Markings: White tower with black lantern
- Heritage: National Register of Historic Places listed place
- Fog signal: none

Light
- First lit: 1838
- Deactivated: 1952–1961
- Focal height: 41 feet (12 m)
- Lens: Fifth order Fresnel lens (original), 9.8 inches (250 mm) lens (1996) (current)
- Range: 12 nautical miles (22 km; 14 mi)
- Characteristic: Isophase white, 6 seconds
- Ned Point Light
- U.S. National Register of Historic Places
- MPS: Lighthouses of Massachusetts TR
- NRHP reference No.: 87001488
- Added to NRHP: June 15, 1987

Ned Point Light is a historic lighthouse on Ned's Point Road in Mattapoisett, Massachusetts. The lighthouse was built in 1838 at a cost of approximately $5,000, and named after Ned Dexter, a local farmer. Under the supervision of a local builder, Leonard Hammond, the lighthouse was constructed with a birdcage-style lantern similar to Bird Island Light found in Marion, Massachusetts. The stone used for the lighthouse was all locally sourced, with most of it originating from nearby beaches. Inside, there are 32 granite steps that are cantilevered to the outside wall without the use of mortar. The original lantern used 11 whale oil lamps, each with its own parabolic reflector. The lamps and reflectors were replaced by a fifth order Fresnel lens in 1857, along with a change to an octagonal lantern. The Great Blizzard of 1888 significantly damaged the keeper's stone house, resulting in it being demolished and the building of a wooden replacement.

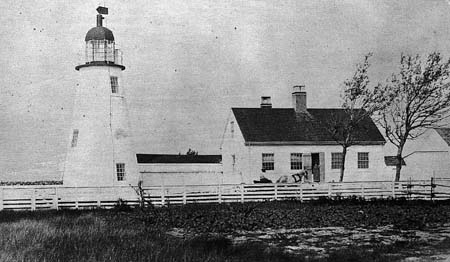
The original Ned Point Light in Massachusetts, showing its original bird-cage lantern and keeper's house

Following the lighthouse's automation in 1923, the keeper's house became unnecessary. The original stone keeper's house was loaded on a barge and taken to Wing's Neck Light in Bourne, Massachusetts. The lighthouse was deactivated from 1952, but remained under control of the US Coast Guard. Following modernization in 1961, the lighthouse was reactivated in 1961 with its current 6-second isophase. The lighthouse was added to the National Register of Historic Places in 1982, and approved in 1988.

== See also ==
- National Register of Historic Places listings in Plymouth County, Massachusetts
