= Emma Toft =

American Politician from Wisconsin

- Born: February 9, 1891; Baileys Harbor, Wisconsin
- Died: February 14, 1982 (aged 91); Sturgeon Bay, Wisconsin
- Other names: "Miss Emma," "Wisconsin's First Lady of Conservation"
- Occupation: Conservationist
- Known for: Preserving an ancient forest in Door County, Wisconsin

Emma Toft (February 9, 1891 — February 14, 1982) was an American conservationist who became known as "Wisconsin's First Lady of Conservation" following her efforts to preserve an ancient forest in Door County, Wisconsin.

== Biography ==
Toft's father Thomas was born Thomas Kresten Jensen on June 1, 1844, in Denmark, one of fourteen children. He, along with two of his brothers, moved to Racine, Wisconsin, in 1863, where they changed their last names to Toft. The brothers bought a farm in Minnesota, but Thomas Toft sold his share in 1871 and moved to Baileys Harbor, Wisconsin. Three years later, he married Julia Anne Panter.

Leading up to Emma's 1891 birth, Thomas had purchased over 300 acres of ancient forest in Door County, Wisconsin. She grew up on the land before attending Oshkosh Normal School to become an English teacher, and briefly studied nursing at the Presbyterian Hospital in Chicago. Upon her father's 1919 death, Toft returned to the land and began a summer resort with her mother and siblings, that they called Toft's Point. The property had three rustic cabins, as well as a converted chicken coop for guests to stay in, but offered no running water, electricity (until 1949), or flushing toilets. Emma lived at the Point much of the time and kept the lodge running for over fifty years, often cooking her guests meals with produce grown on-site.

Thomas and Julia Toft fought a protracted battle over a disputed border of their property (containing valuable old growth pines) with prominent logger Moses Kilgore and the subsequent owners of his property. The Supreme Court ruled in favor of the Tofts in 1926, but the nearly 20 year legal battle was a financial and emotional drain on the family. Emma Toft later refused several offers from developers who wanted to turn the valuable land into a golf development or resort area for the wealthy.

Toft was the only one of her siblings to remain unmarried. She told Norbert Blei that she once had a fiancé from Rowleys Bay, but that he was killed in World War I.

In 1937, Toft was one of those with Albert Fuller, Jens Jensen, and Olivia Traven, to establish The Ridges Sanctuary in Baileys Harbor. In 1964, Door County naturalist and writer Roy Lukes was hired by The Ridges, where he began a close friendship with Emma until her death. She taught him how to lure black-capped chickadees and red-breasted nuthatches by hand.

The Toft family sold the resort property to The Nature Conservancy in 1967, who in turn gave it to the University of Wisconsin–Green Bay. Toft Point has been used for scientific research, starting with a 1978 survey of small mammal communities in the region. Toft spent the last several years of her life at the Dorchester Nursing Home in Sturgeon Bay, Wisconsin, before dying on February 14, 1982, at the age of 91.

== Legacy ==
In his 1981 book Door Way, Blei referred to Toft as "a legend, bordering on myth", while Lukes was the first to refer to her as "Wisconsin's first lady of conservation". Toft was one of those honored at American artist Terese Agnew's 2017 exhibit on progressive figures in Wisconsin history.
