= Baileys Harbor Town Hall-McArdle Library =

- U.S. National Register of Historic Places
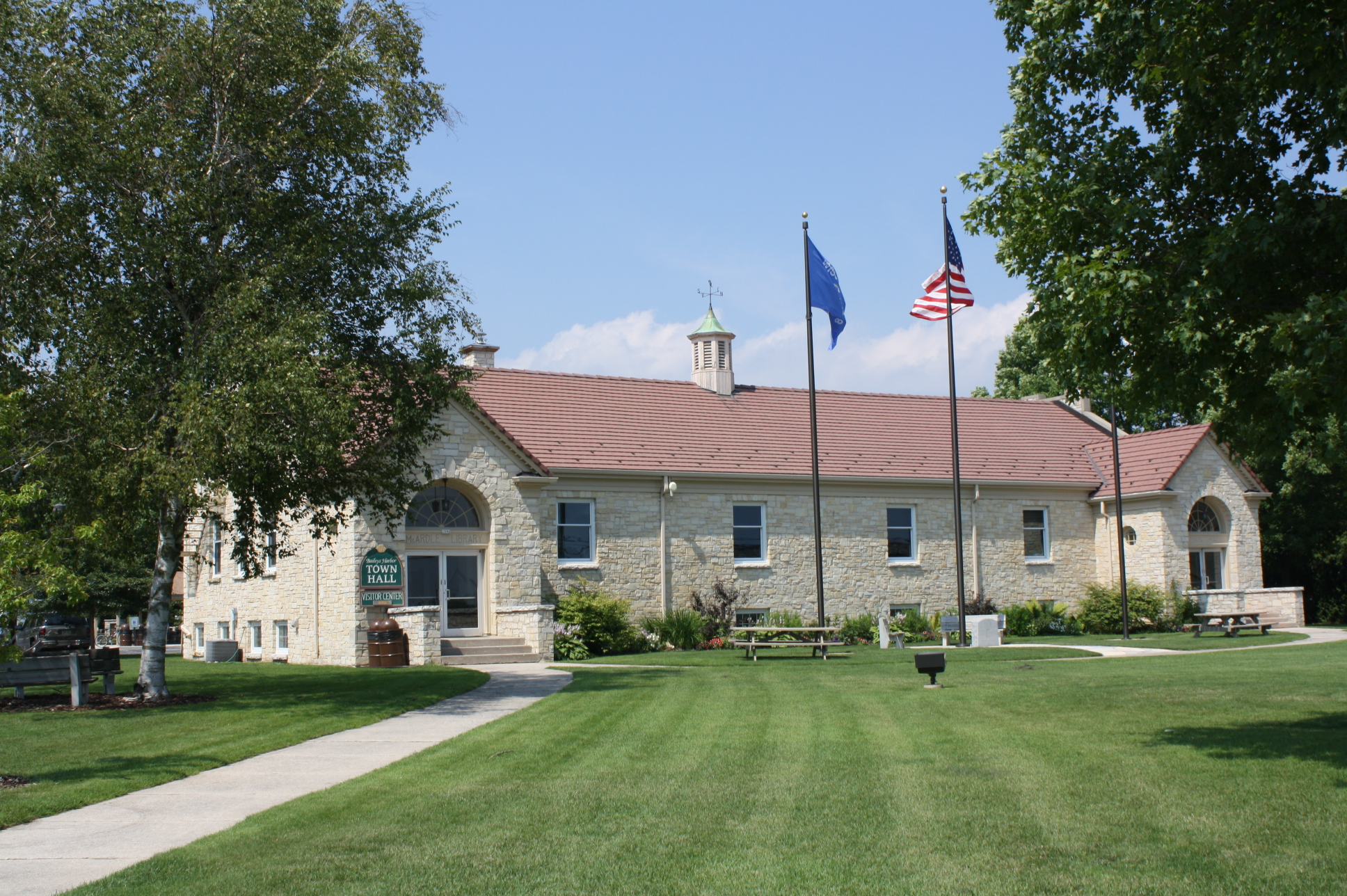
- Baileys Harbor Town Hall-McArdle Library
- Location: 2392 Cty Trunk Hwy F. Baileys Harbor, Wisconsin
- Coordinates: 45.066°N 87.12434°W
- Architectural style: Colonial Revival
- NRHP reference No.: 00000408
- Added to NRHP: April 21, 2000

The Baileys Harbor Town Hall-McArdle Library is located in Baileys Harbor, Wisconsin. It was added to the National Register of Historic Places in 2000.

== History ==
The town hall was opened in the 1930s. In 1938, the library was established after Michael W. McArdle left the money in his will to start up a library in the town. Additionally, the building houses a kitchen, an auditorium, and the town clerk's office.
