= Bird-cage lantern =

Lantern common to American lighthouses in the early years of the nineteenth century

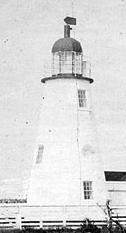
The original Ned Point Light in Massachusetts, showing its original bird-cage lantern.

A bird-cage lantern was the style of lantern common to American lighthouses in the early years of the nineteenth century. The lanterns received their name because of their appearance; they are shaped like wire bird cages.

When Fresnel lenses were introduced to the country in the 1850s, most lighthouses were retrofitted with new lanterns, as the older ones could not support the new style of lens. Consequently, only four lighthouses with original bird-cage lanterns survive in the United States; those that do were discontinued before they could be fitted for the new lantern.

== Remaining lanterns ==
- Baileys Harbor Light, Wisconsin
- Selkirk Light, New York
- Waugoshance Light, Michigan
- Prudence Island Light, Rhode Island
- Old Cape Henry Light, Virginia

== Images ==
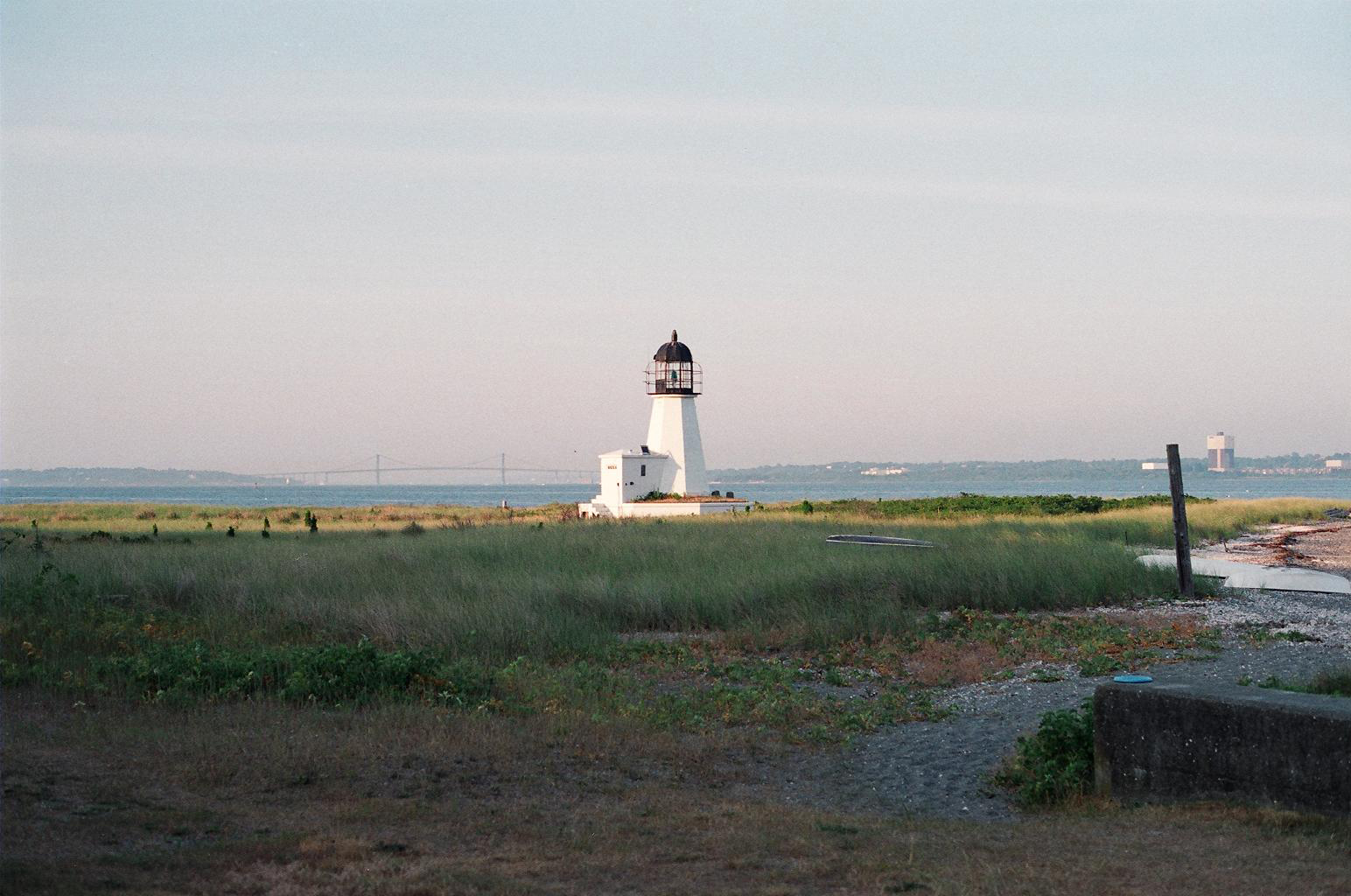
Prudence Island Light

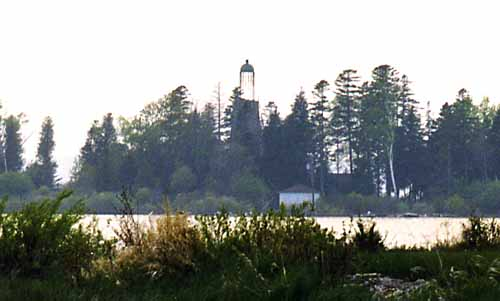
Baileys Harbor Light

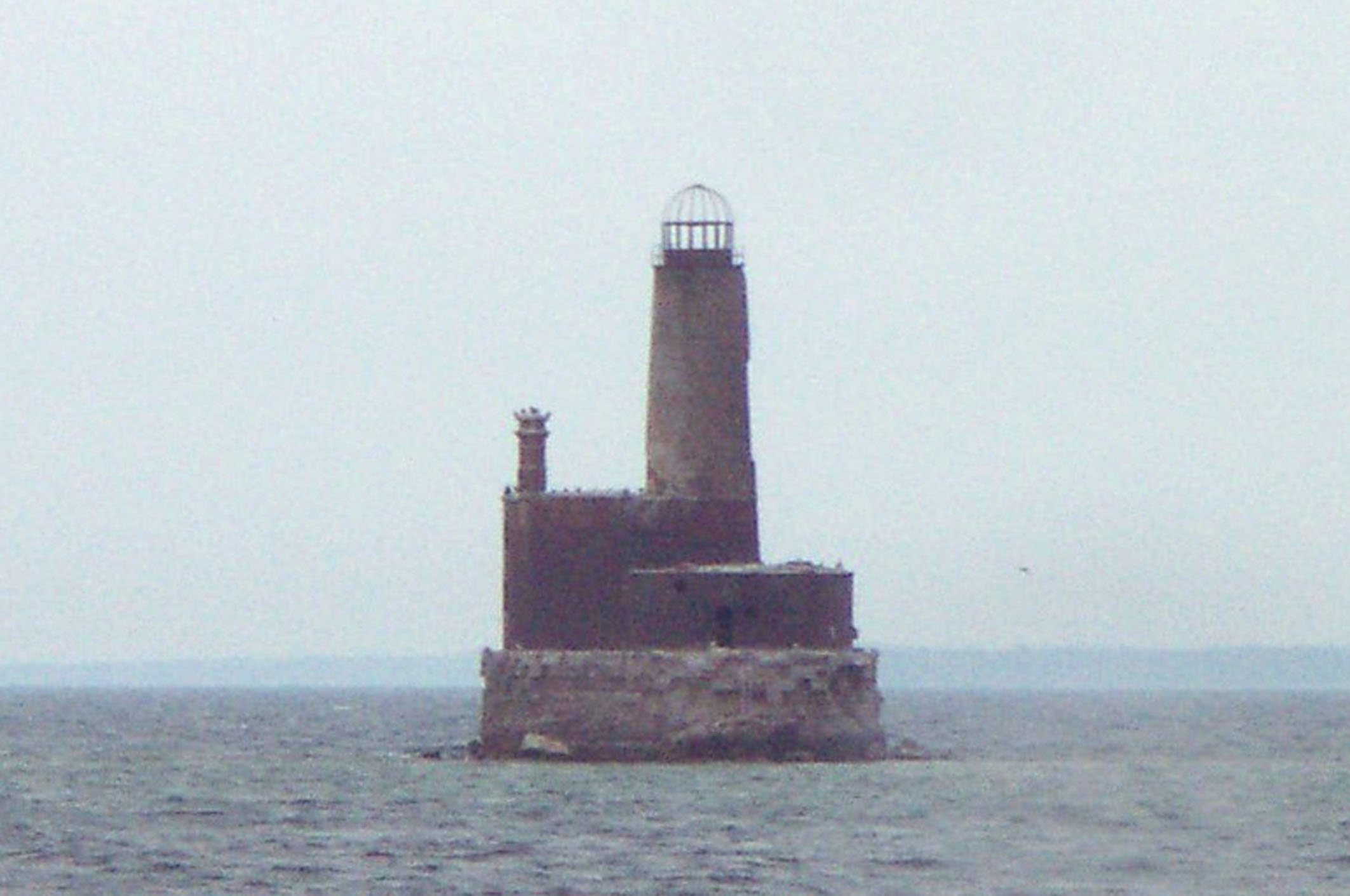
Waugoshance Light
