= Baileys Harbor Light =

Lighthouse in Wisconsin, United States

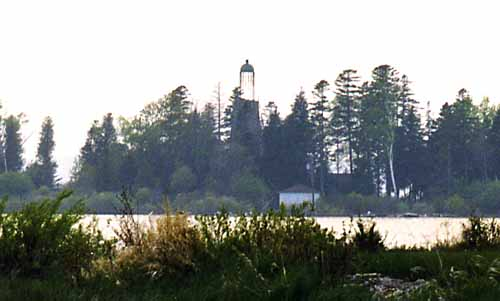
- Location: Baileys Harbor, Wisconsin
- Coordinates: 45°03′21″N 87°05′49″W

Tower
- Constructed: 1852
- Construction: Stone
- Height: 52ft

Light
- First lit: 1853
- Deactivated: 1869
- Lens: Sixth order Fresnel lens
- Characteristic: Fixed white light

The Baileys Harbor lighthouse is a lighthouse located near Baileys Harbor in Door County, Wisconsin.

Construction of Baileys Harbor Lighthouse began in 1852 and in 1853 David Ward became the first lighthouse keeper. It was the third lighthouse constructed in Door County after the lighthouses on Rock Island and Plum Island. An 1866 inspection declared the lighthouse was in "very defective condition" and in late fall of 1869 it closed. This coincided with the opening of the Baileys Harbor Range Lights and the Cana Island Lighthouse in 1870 which replaced it. Today the island is privately owned and the lighthouse is in decay but still standing.

It is one of four lighthouses in the country to have retained its bird-cage lantern.

== Gallery ==
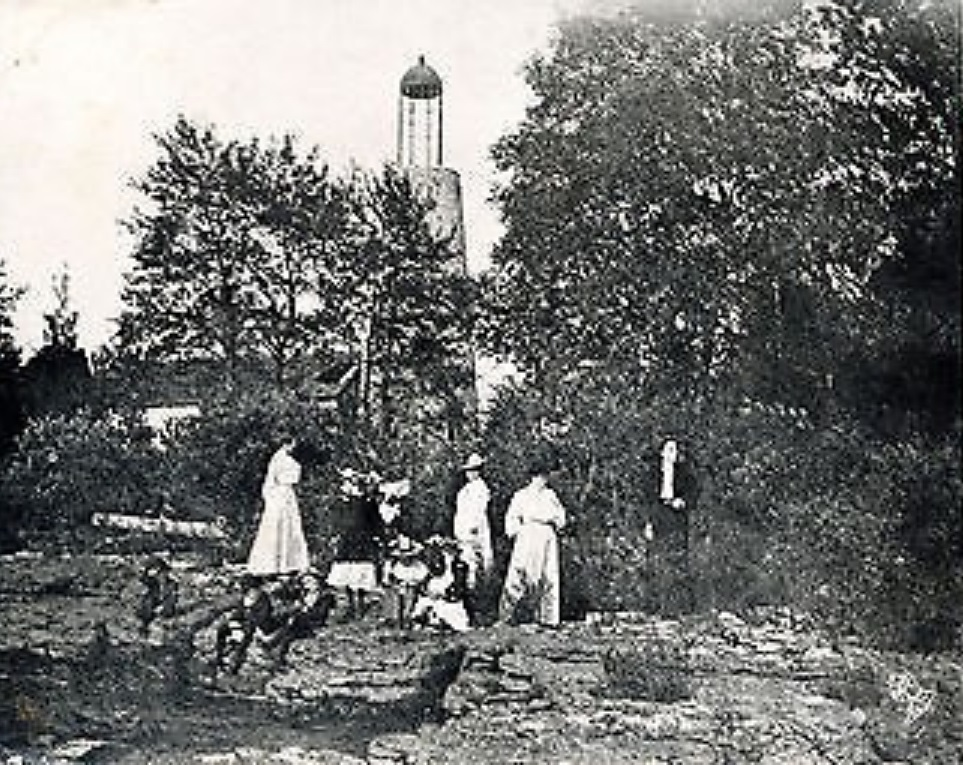
Baileys Harbor Light; from a postcard circa 1905
