= Baileys Harbor, Wisconsin =

- Town
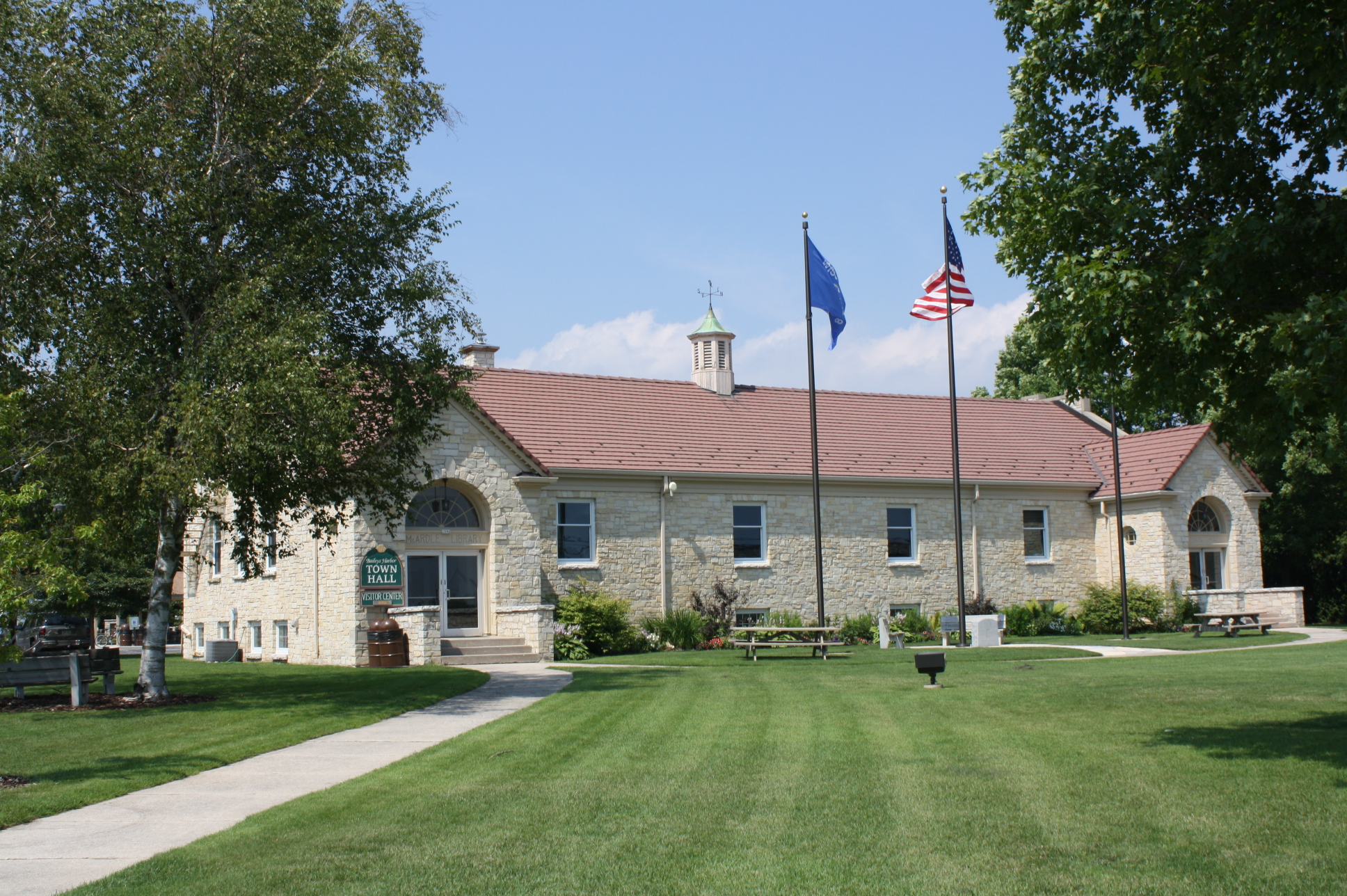
- Baileys Harbor Town Hall-McArdle Library

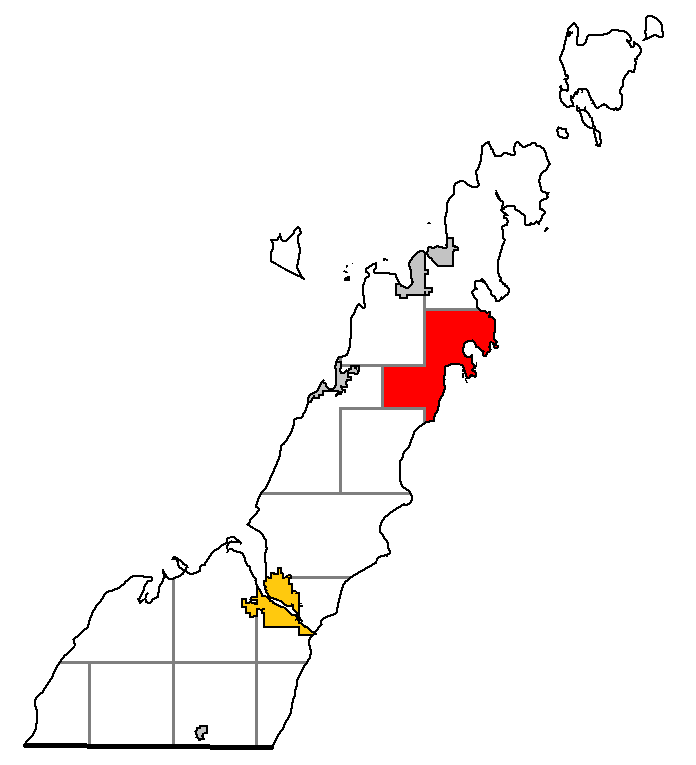
- Location of Baileys Harbor, within Door County
- Coordinates: 45°3′47″N 87°7′29″W
- Country: United States
- State: Wisconsin
- County: Door

Area
  - Total: 68.8 sq mi (178.1 km^{2})
  - Land: 29.5 sq mi (76.5 km^{2})
  - Water: 39.2 sq mi (101.6 km^{2})
- Elevation: 584 ft (178 m)

Population (2020)
  - Total: 1,223
  - Density: 41.4/sq mi (16.0/km^{2})
- Time zone: UTC-6 (Central (CST))
  - Summer (DST): UTC-5 (CDT)
- Area code: 920
- FIPS code: 55-04325
- GNIS feature ID: 1582742
- Website: https://baileysharborwi.gov/

Baileys Harbor is a town in Door County, Wisconsin, United States. The population was 1,223 at the 2020 census. The unincorporated community of Peninsula Center is located in the town. The census-designated place of Baileys Harbor is also located with the town.

== History ==
The town was named for a Great Lakes ship captain named Bailey who was caught in an unexpected severe storm in 1848 and found shelter in the harbor. The area was formerly known as Gibraltar. A Native American name for the harbor is "Ah-quah-o-me-ning", meaning "Fish go to shore".

== Geography ==
According to the United States Census Bureau, the town has a total area of 68.8 square miles (178.1 km^{2}), of which 29.5 square miles (76.5 km^{2}) is land and 39.2 square miles (101.6 km^{2}) (57.07%) is water.

== Demographics ==
As of the census of 2000, there were 1,003 people, 483 households, and 301 families residing in the town. The population density was 34 people per square mile (13.1/km^{2}). There were 1,029 housing units at an average density of 34.9 per square mile (13.5/km^{2}). The racial makeup of the town was 98.21% White, 0.1% African American, 0.4% Native American, 0.3% Asian, 0.2% from other races, and 0.8% from two or more races. Hispanic or Latino people of any race were 1.60% of the population.

There were 483 households, out of which 19.5% had children under the age of 18 living with them, 54.5% were married couples living together, 5.2% had a female householder with no husband present, and 37.5% were non-families. 32.5% of all households were made up of individuals, and 12.6% had someone living alone who was 65 years of age or older. The average household size was 2.08 and the average family size was 2.6.

In the town, the population was spread out, with 17% under the age of 18, 5.5% from 18 to 24, 24.1% from 25 to 44, 32.1% from 45 to 64, and 21.2% who were 65 years of age or older. The median age was 47 years. For every 100 females, there were 99 males. For every 100 females age 18 and over, there were 96.7 males.

The median income for a household in the town was $41,350, and the median income for a family was $49,250. Males had a median income of $31,705 versus $26,458 for females. The per capita income for the town was $23,835. About 1.7% of families and 4.5% of the population were below the poverty line, including none of those under age 18 and 5.4% of those age 65 or over.

== Education ==
Gibraltar Area Schools serves the community. Gibraltar Elementary School and Gibraltar Secondary School are the two schools.

== Climate ==
Baileys Harbor

Climate chart (precipitation, max. and min. temperature)
J	F	M	A	M	J	J	A	S	O	N	D
63 −4 −5	52 −6 −8	49 0 −3	97 3 1	86 7 3	91 14 9	105 15 14	96 18 17	96 16 15	107 10 6	80 4 4	57 3 −2
- █ Average max. and min. temperatures in °C
- █ Precipitation totals in mm
Imperial conversion
J	F	M	A	M	J	J	A	S	O	N	D
2.5 25 23	2 21 18	1.9 32 27	3.8 37 34	3.4 45 37	3.6 57 48	4.1 59 57	3.8 64 63	3.8 61 59	4.2 50 43	3.1 39 39	2.2 37 28
- █ Average max. and min. temperatures in °F
- █ Precipitation totals in inches

== Media ==
- Door County Pulse

== Notable people ==
- Phoebe Erickson (1907–2006), children's book author and illustrator
- Moses Kilgore (1817–1890), Wisconsin state legislator, shipbuilder, and businessman
- Paul Sills, theater director
- Emma Toft, conservationist
- Lloyd Wasserbach, professional football player

== Gallery ==
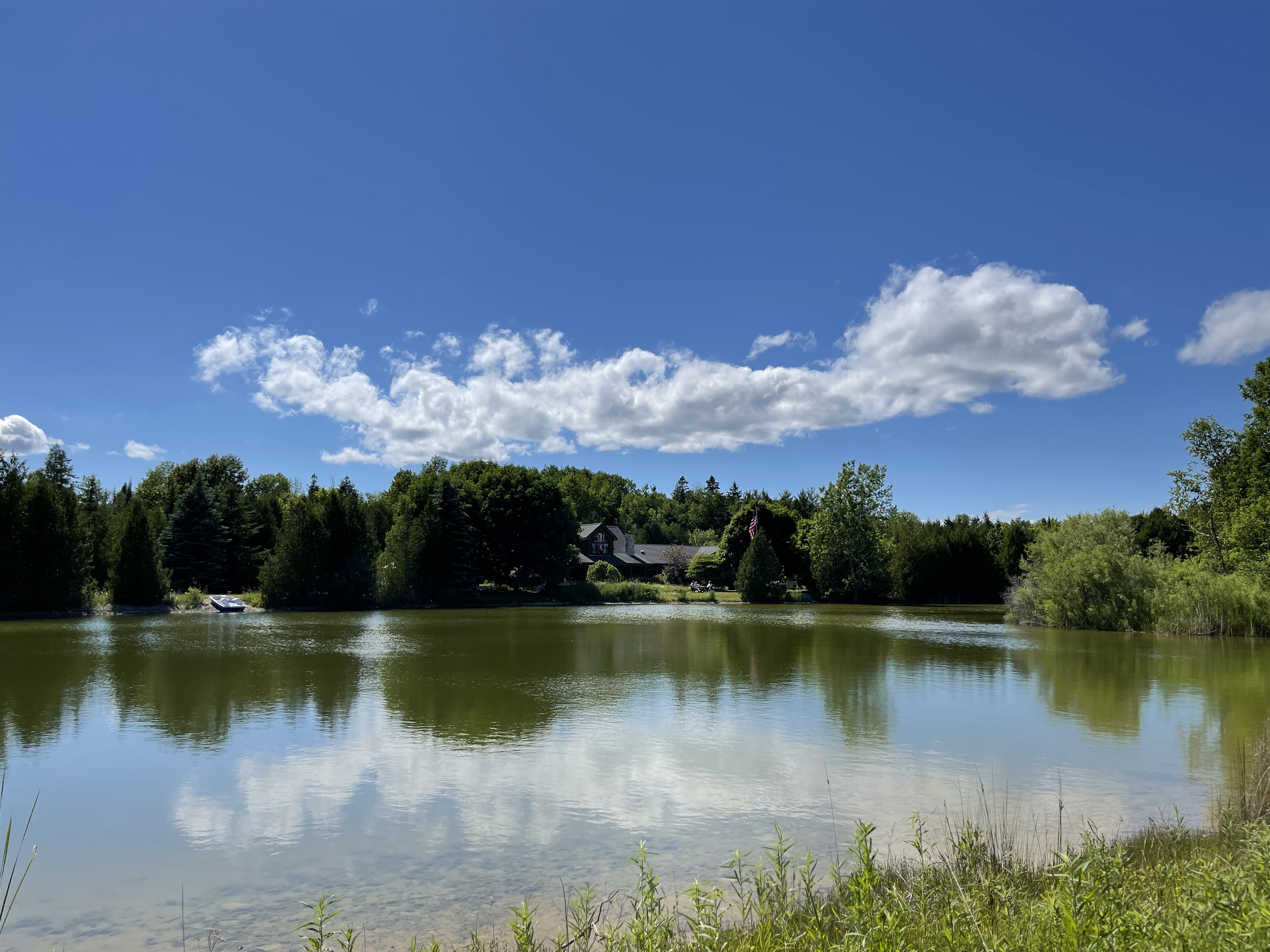
Ritland Cedar Pond

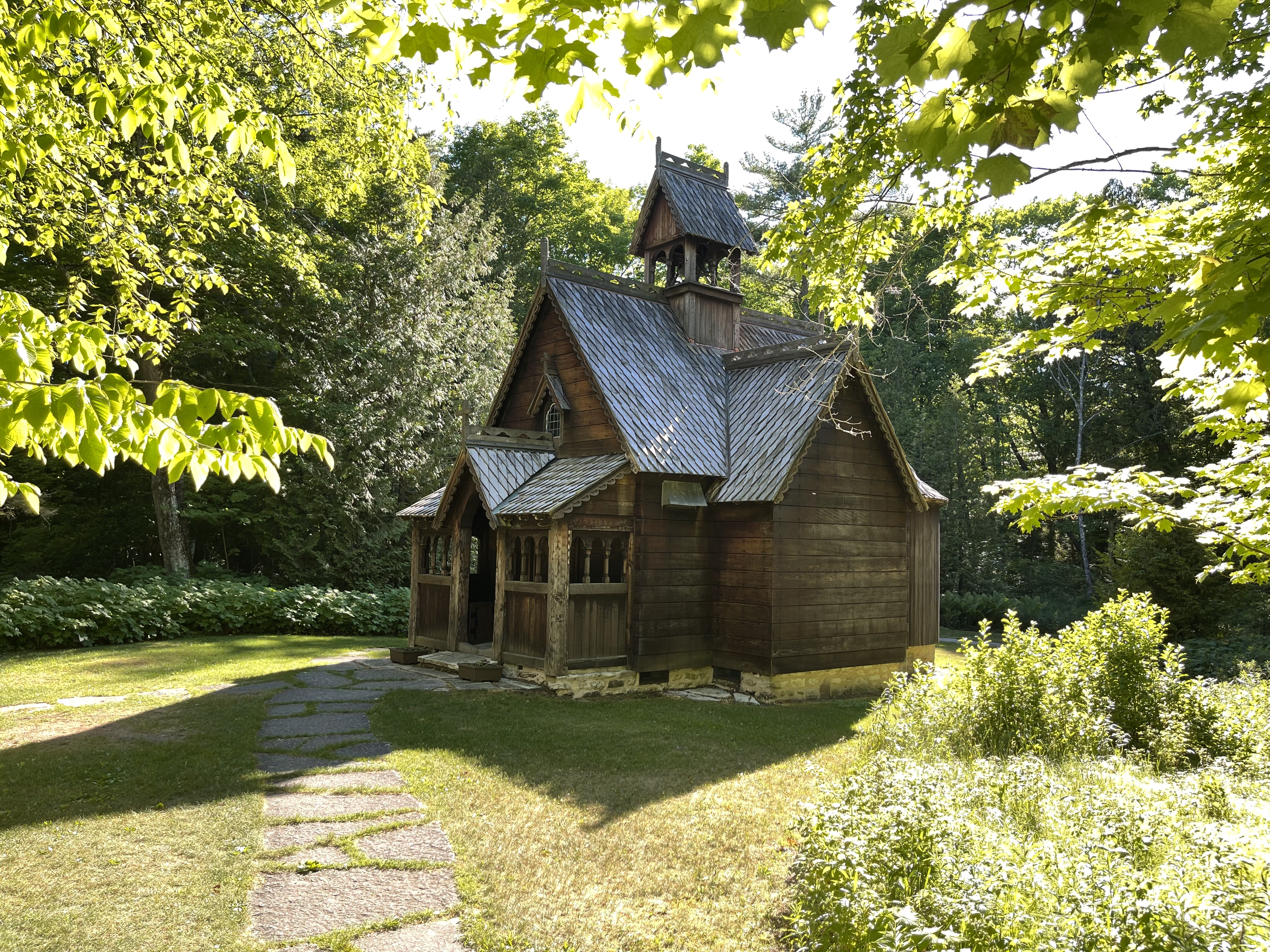
Boynton Chapel at Björklunden

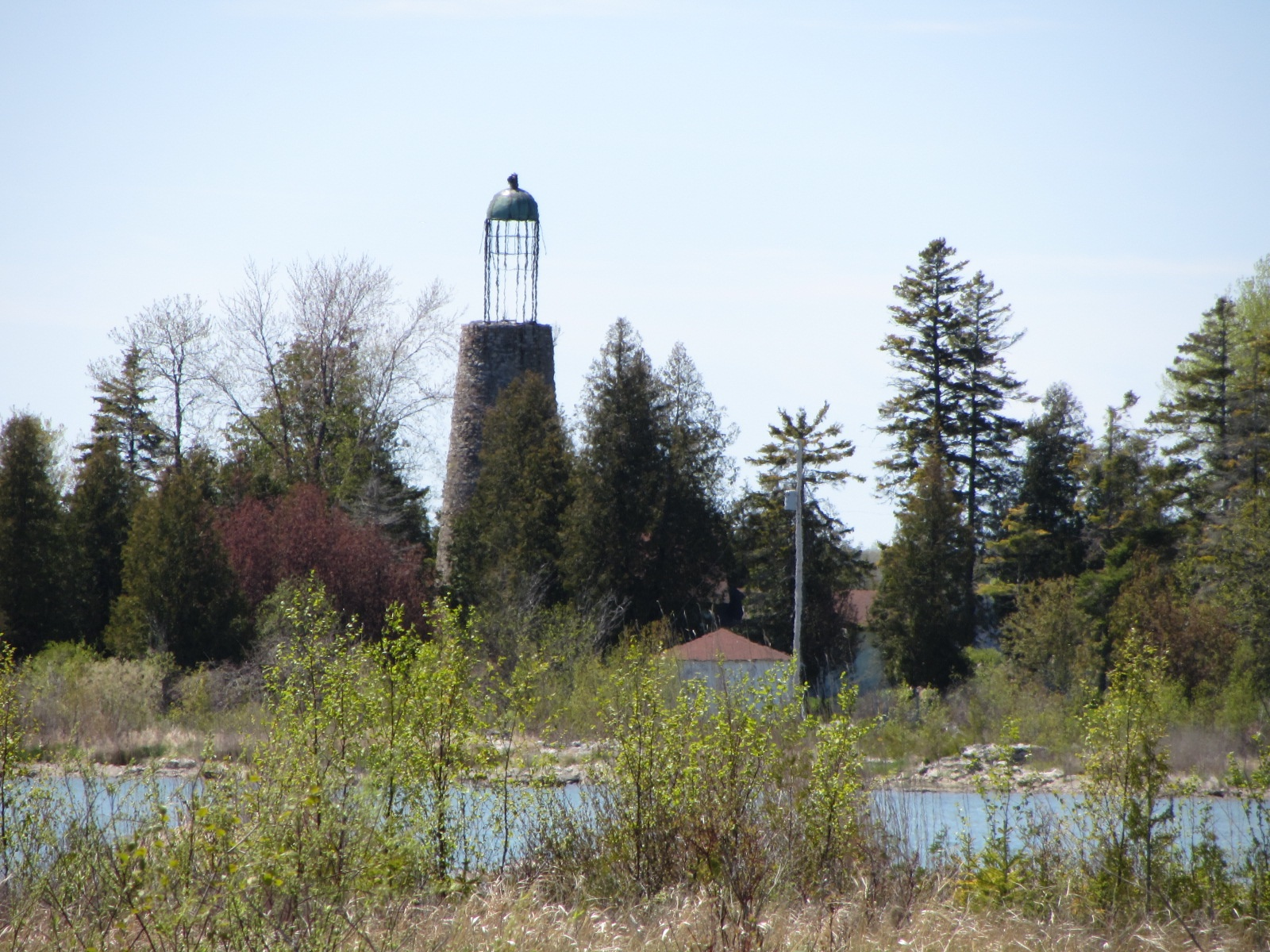
Baileys Harbor Lighthouse, the birdcage lighthouse

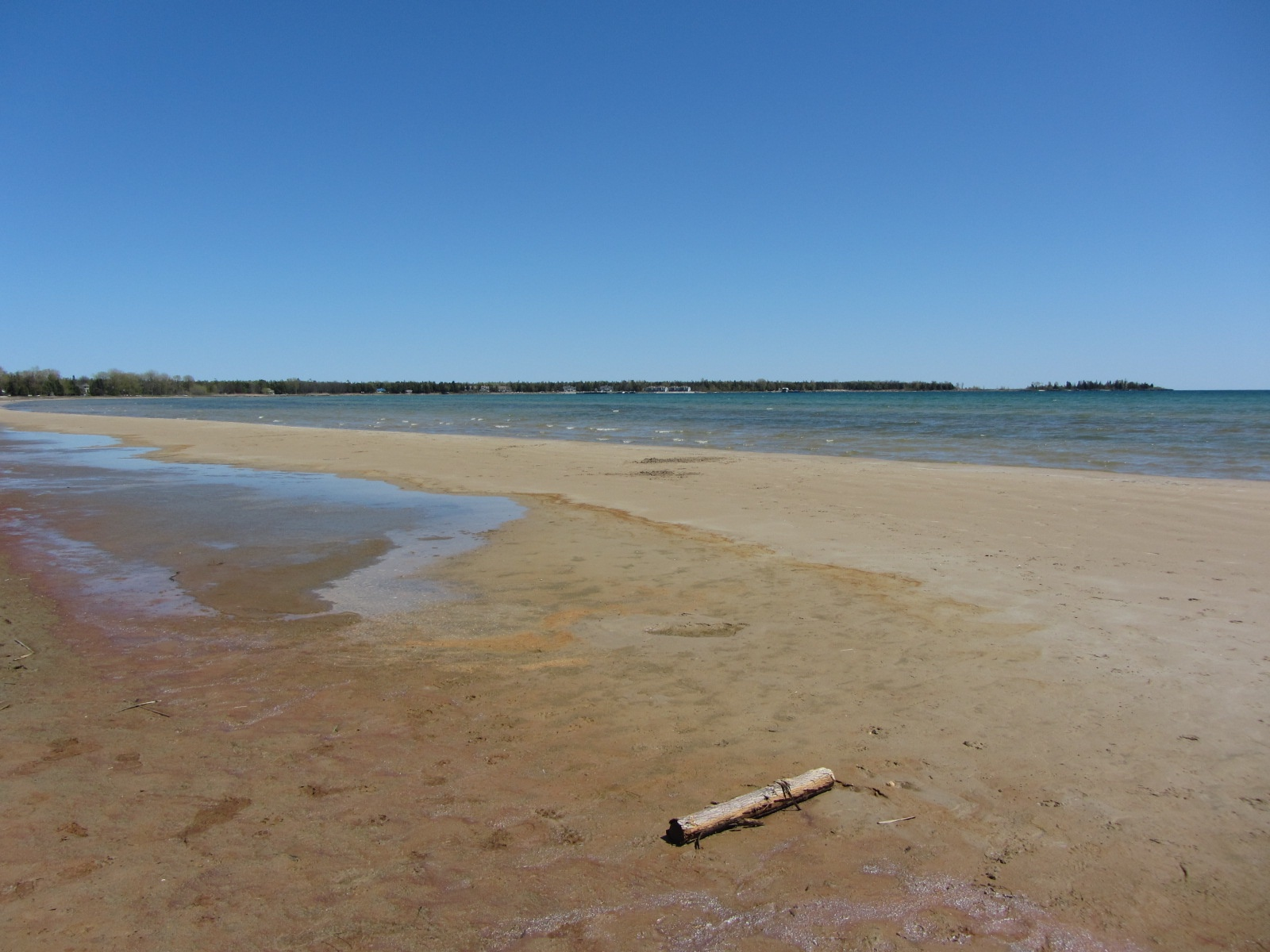
Ridges Park beach

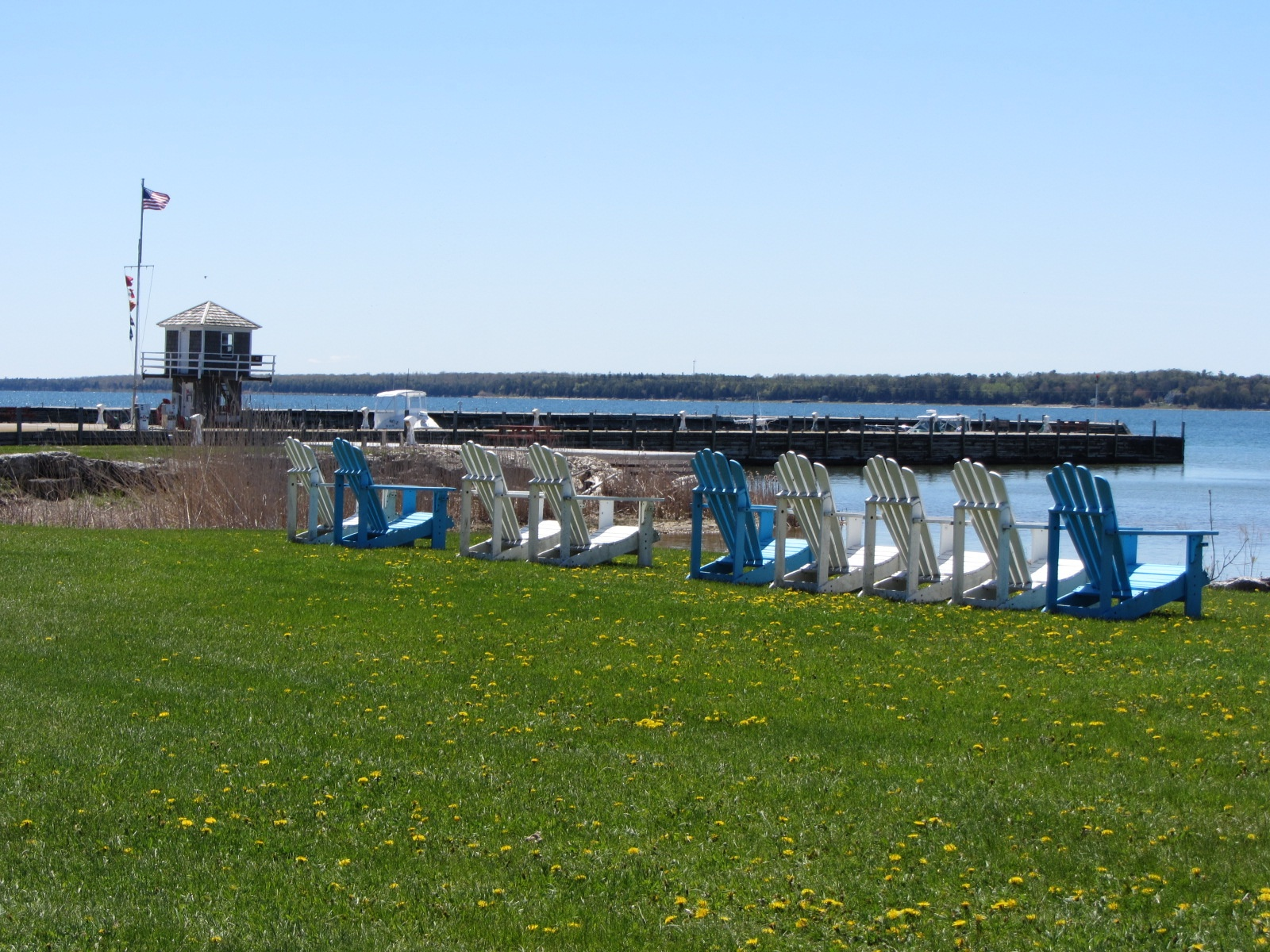
Baileys Harbor Yacht Club Resort

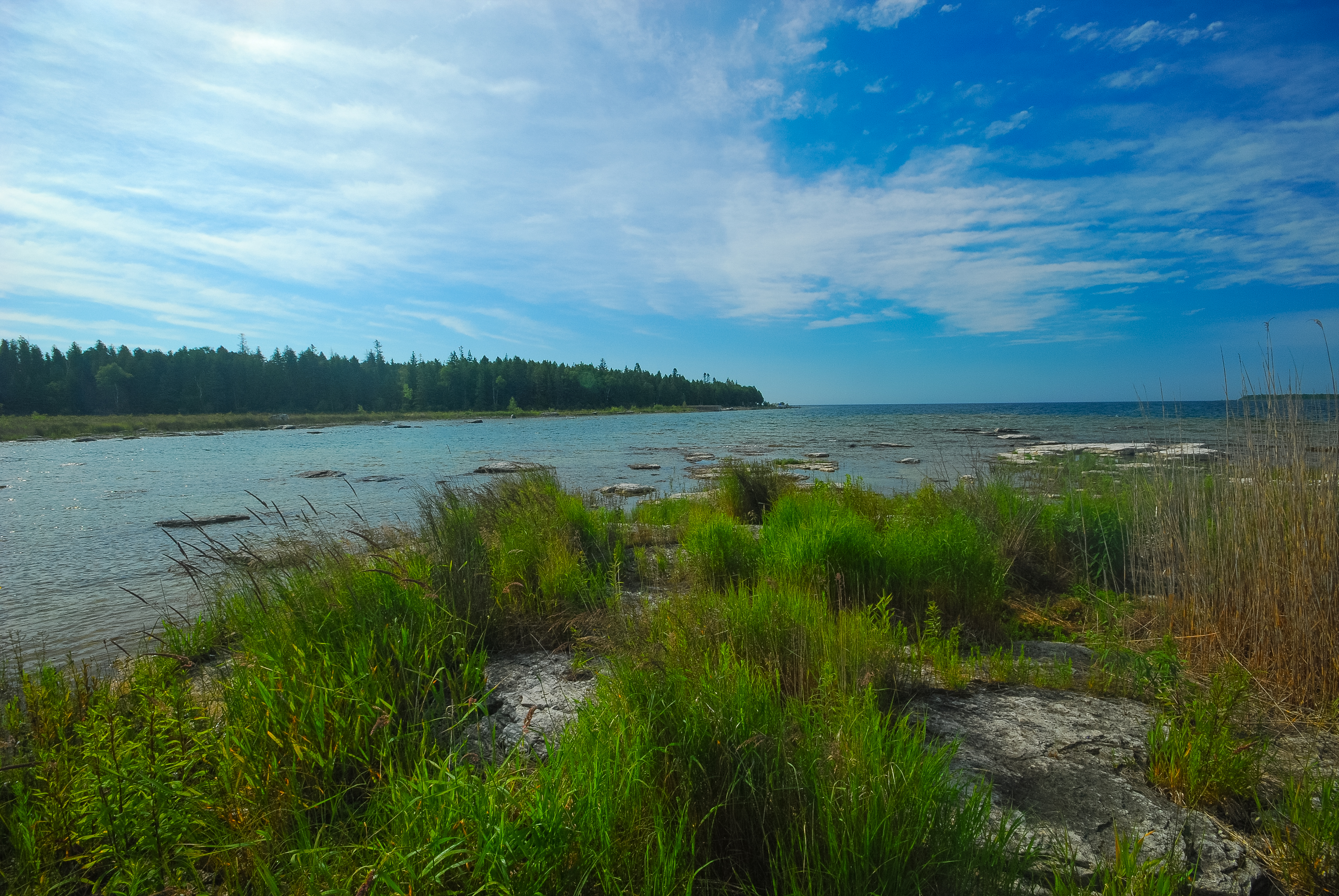
Moonlight Bay

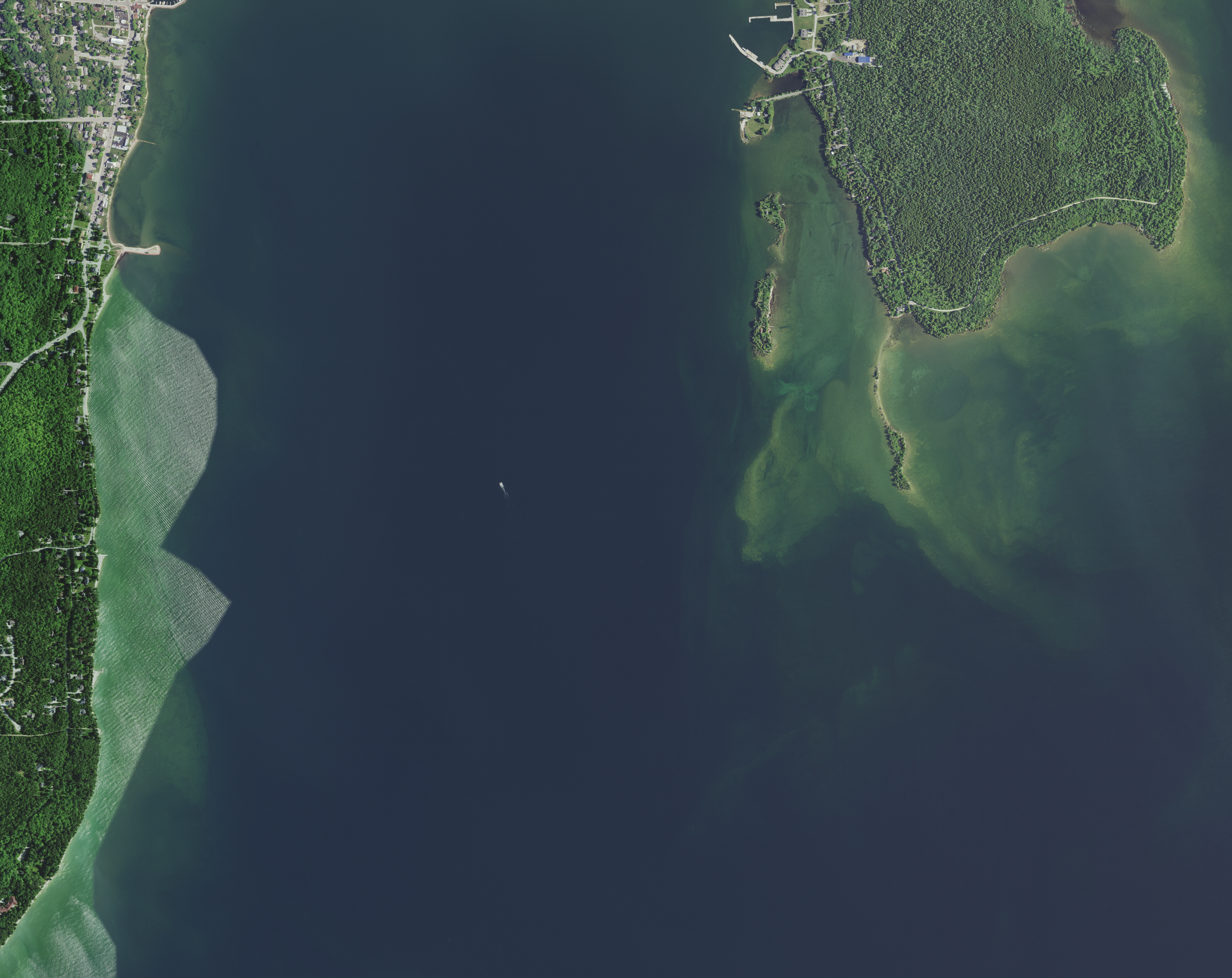
Part of eastern Baileys Harbor

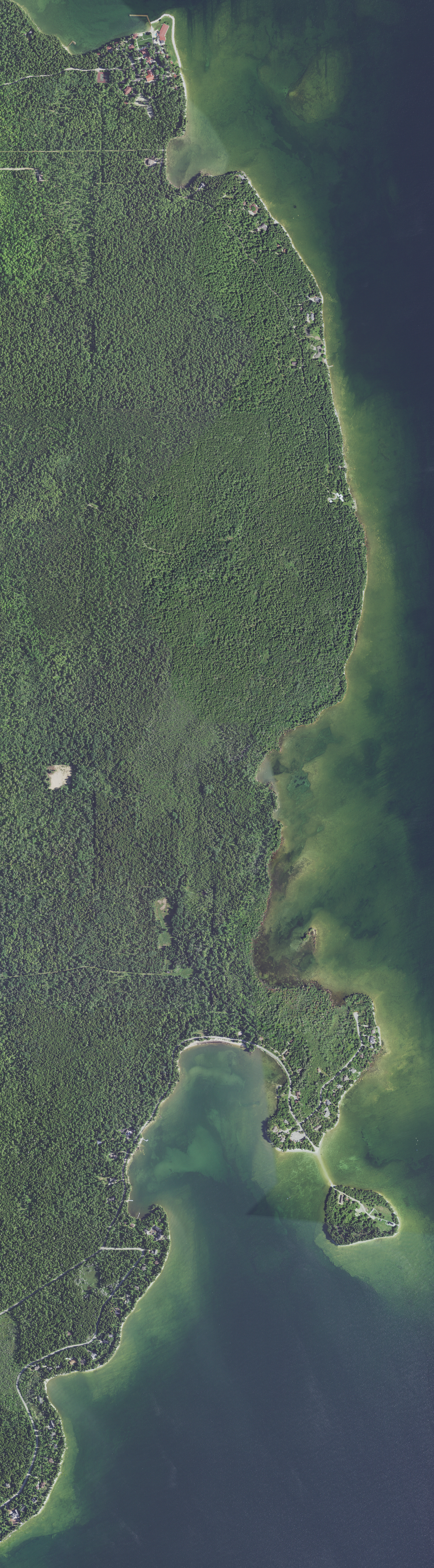
Northeastern Baileys Harbor

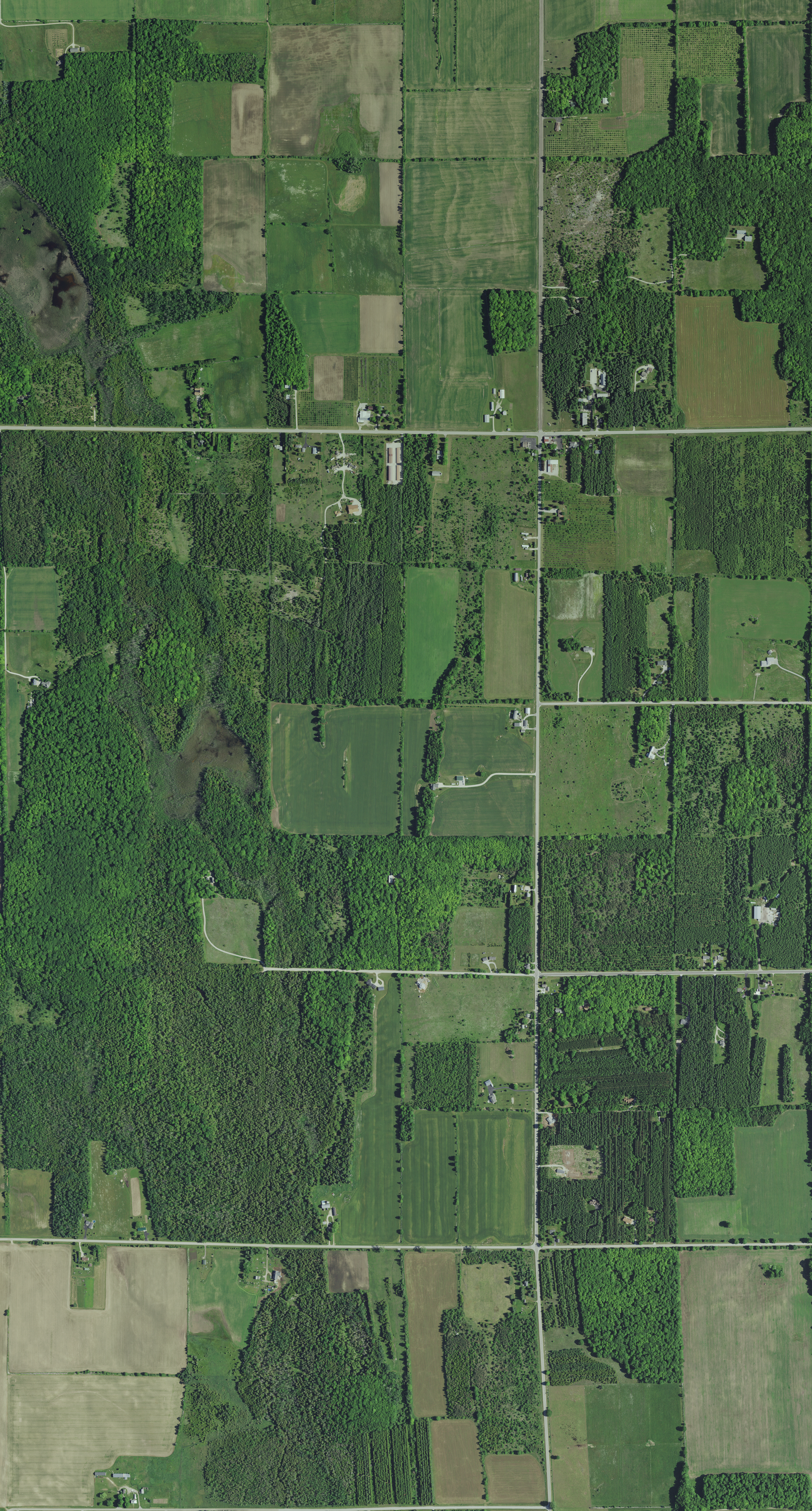
Southwestern Baileys Harbor, including Peninsula Center
