= National Register of Historic Places listings in Lake County, Illinois =

Location of Lake County in Illinois

This is a list of the National Register of Historic Places listings in Lake County, Illinois.

This is intended to be a complete list of the properties and districts on the National Register of Historic Places in Lake County, Illinois, United States. Latitude and longitude coordinates are provided for many National Register properties and districts; these locations may be seen together in a map.

There are 98 properties and districts listed on the National Register in the county, including two National Historic Landmarks. Another three properties were once listed but have been removed.

This National Park Service list is complete through NPS recent listings posted May 22, 2026.

== Current listings ==
	Name on the Register	Image	Date listed	Location	City or town	Description
1	Mary W. Adams House	Mary W. Adams House	September 29, 1982 (#82002552)	1923 Lake Avenue; 42°11′15″N 87°47′21″W	Highland Park	
2	David Adler Estate	David Adler Estate	November 22, 1999 (#99001380)	1700 North Milwaukee Avenue; 42°18′08″N 87°57′24″W	Libertyville	
3	Mrs. Isaac D. Adler House	Mrs. Isaac D. Adler House	August 28, 2002 (#02000901)	1480 North Milwaukee Avenue; 42°18′02″N 87°57′08″W	Libertyville	
4	J. Ogden Armour House	J. Ogden Armour House	June 28, 1982 (#82002578)	1500 West Kennedy Road; 42°14′53″N 87°53′27″W	Lake Forest	
5	Lester Armour House	Lester Armour House	May 3, 1984 (#84001131)	Sheridan Road; 42°17′34″N 87°50′04″W	Lake Bluff	
6	Philip D. Armour III House	Philip D. Armour III House	November 15, 1996 (#96001342)	900 Armour Drive; 42°17′20″N 87°51′11″W	Lake Bluff	
7	Barrington Historic District	Barrington Historic District	May 16, 1986 (#86001047)	Roughly bounded by Chicago and Northwestern Railroad, South Spring and Grove Streets, East Hillside and West Coolidge, and Dundee Avenues; 42°09′02″N 88°08′13″W	Barrington	
8	Ross J. Beatty House	Ross J. Beatty House	September 29, 1982 (#82002553)	344 Ravine Drive; 42°10′53″N 87°47′23″W	Highland Park	
9	Ross Beatty House	Ross Beatty House	September 29, 1982 (#82002554)	1499 Sheridan Road; 42°10′44″N 87°47′14″W	Highland Park	
10	A. G. Becker Property	A. G. Becker Property	November 15, 1984 (#84000343)	405 Sheridan Road; 42°09′41″N 87°46′05″W	Highland Park	
11	Edward H. Bennett House and Studio	Edward H. Bennett House and Studio	March 3, 1995 (#95000196)	89 East Deerpath; 42°15′01″N 87°50′41″W	Lake Forest	
12	William McCormick Blair Estate	William McCormick Blair Estate	January 31, 2008 (#07001476)	982 Sheridan Road; 42°17′17″N 87°50′45″W	Lake Bluff	
13	Joseph T. Bowen Country Club	Joseph T. Bowen Country Club	November 30, 1978 (#78003400)	1917 North Sheridan Road; 42°23′16″N 87°49′52″W	Waukegan	
14	Braeside School	Braeside School	September 29, 1982 (#82002555)	124 Pierce Road; 42°09′19″N 87°46′19″W	Highland Park	
15	Robert Parker Coffin Bridge	Robert Parker Coffin Bridge	June 11, 2018 (#100001672)	Robert Parker Coffin Rd. over Buffalo Cr. 42°10′39″N 87°59′59″W	Long Grove	
16	Camp Logan National Guard Rifle Range Historic District	Camp Logan National Guard Rifle Range Historic District	June 9, 2000 (#00000640)	Illinois Beach State Park; 42°28′06″N 87°48′31″W	Zion	
17	Albert Campbell House	Albert Campbell House	September 29, 1982 (#82002556)	434 Marshman; 42°10′08″N 87°46′57″W	Highland Park	
18	Catlow Theater	Catlow Theater	August 21, 1989 (#89001112)	112–116 West Main Street; 42°09′16″N 88°08′12″W	Barrington	
19	Chicago, Milwaukee and St. Paul Railway Passenger Depot	Chicago, Milwaukee and St. Paul Railway Passenger Depot	February 5, 1998 (#98000066)	860 Deerfield Road; 42°10′04″N 87°51′00″W	Deerfield	
20	Church of the St. Sava Serbian Orthodox Monastery	Church of the St. Sava Serbian Orthodox Monastery	September 6, 1979 (#79000850)	North of Libertyville on North Milwaukee Avenue; 42°20′01″N 87°57′03″W	Libertyville	
21	Richard Churchill House	Richard Churchill House	September 29, 1982 (#82002557)	1214 Green Bay Road; 42°10′28″N 87°47′49″W	Highland Park	
22	Cook Memorial Library	Cook Memorial Library	August 16, 2001 (#01000867)	413 North Milwaukee Avenue; 42°17′14″N 87°57′19″W	Libertyville	1878 house of contractor and politician Ansel B. Cook, converted to a public library in 1921. Now a Libertyville-Mundelein Historical Society house museum.
23	Deerpath Hill Estates Historic District	Deerpath Hill Estates Historic District	August 7, 2006 (#06000676)	Roughly bounded by Northcliffe Way, King Muir Road and Waukegan Road; 42°14′44″N 87°52′13″W	Lake Forest	
24	Deerpath Inn	Deerpath Inn	May 11, 1992 (#92000482)	255 East Illinois Road; 42°14′59″N 87°50′27″W	Lake Forest	
25	Dewey House	Dewey House	May 8, 1985 (#85001008)	Veterans Administration Medical Center; 42°18′13″N 87°51′34″W	North Chicago	
26	Henry Dubin House	Henry Dubin House	September 29, 1982 (#82002558)	441 Cedar; 42°10′19″N 87°47′12″W	Highland Park	
27	Mrs. C. Morse Ely House	Mrs. C. Morse Ely House	November 8, 2000 (#00001339)	111 Moffett Road; 42°16′18″N 87°49′57″W	Lake Bluff	
28	Evert House	Evert House	September 29, 1982 (#82002559)	2687 Logan; 42°12′06″N 87°48′20″W	Highland Park	
29	Mildred and Abel Fagen House		February 4, 2021 (#100006090)	1711 Devonshire Ln. 42°12′30″N 87°53′17″W	Lake Forest	
30	Harold Florsheim House	Harold Florsheim House	September 29, 1982 (#82002560)	650 Sheridan Road; 42°09′51″N 87°46′22″W	Highland Park	
31	Fort Sheridan Historic District	Fort Sheridan Historic District	September 29, 1980 (#80001379)	Off Illinois Route 22; 42°13′03″N 87°48′42″W	Fort Sheridan	
32	Louis Fredrick House		June 24, 2019 (#100003649)	19 W. County Line Rd. 42°09′15″N 88°11′04″W	Barrington	
33	Mrs. Frank Geyso Houses	Mrs. Frank Geyso Houses	September 29, 1982 (#82002561)	450 and 456 Woodland Road; 42°09′41″N 87°46′39″W	Highland Park	
34	Granville-Mott House	Granville-Mott House	September 29, 1982 (#82002562)	80 Laurel Avenue; 42°11′17″N 87°47′16″W	Highland Park	
35	Great Lakes Naval Training Station	Great Lakes Naval Training Station	September 15, 1986 (#86002890)	Bounded by Cluverius Avenue, Lake Michigan, G Street, and Sheridan Road; 42°18′46″N 87°50′03″W	North Chicago	
36	Green Bay Road Historic District	Green Bay Road Historic District	November 7, 1995 (#95001235)	Roughly, area surrounding 10 S to 1596 N Green Bay Road and Ahwahnee Road; 42°15′43″N 87°50′52″W	Lake Forest	
37	John Griffith Store Building	John Griffith Store Building	February 5, 2003 (#02001755)	103–113 East Scranton Avenue; 42°16′53″N 87°50′37″W	Lake Bluff	
38	Grigsby Estate	Grigsby Estate	May 12, 1987 (#87000649)	125 Buckley Road; 42°10′20″N 88°10′43″W	Barrington Hills	
39	David Hall House	David Hall House	August 25, 2014 (#14000506)	25420 W. Cedar Crest Ln. 42°25′29″N 88°07′46″W	Lake Villa	
40	Hazel Avenue/Prospect Avenue Historic District	Hazel Avenue/Prospect Avenue Historic District	September 29, 1982 (#82002563)	St. Johns, Hazel, Dale, Forest, and Prospect Avenues; 42°11′01″N 87°47′38″W	Highland Park	
41	Frank Hibbard Estate House-Deerpath Hill Estates	Frank Hibbard Estate House-Deerpath Hill Estates	May 12, 2006 (#06000379)	301 North Chiltern Dr. 42°14′51″N 87°51′52″W	Lake Forest	
42	Highland Park Water Tower	Highland Park Water Tower	September 29, 1982 (#82002564)	North of Central Green Bay Road; 42°11′09″N 87°48′15″W	Highland Park	
43	Samuel Holmes House	Samuel Holmes House	September 29, 1982 (#82002565)	2693 Sheridan Road; 42°12′09″N 87°47′50″W	Highland Park	
44	Holy Family Church	Holy Family Church	August 21, 2003 (#03000780)	1840 Lincoln Street; 42°19′30″N 87°50′34″W	North Chicago	
45	Hotel Waukegan	Hotel Waukegan	October 28, 1994 (#94001269)	102 Washington Street; 42°21′35″N 87°49′48″W	Waukegan	
46	House at 380 Chiltern Drive-Deerpath Hill Estates	House at 380 Chiltern Drive-Deerpath Hill Estates	May 12, 2006 (#06000378)	380 Chiltern Dr. 42°14′56″N 87°51′55″W	Lake Forest	
47	House at 965 Castlegate Court-Deerpath Hill Estates	House at 965 Castlegate Court-Deerpath Hill Estates	May 12, 2006 (#06000382)	965 Castlegate Court; 42°15′16″N 87°52′14″W	Lake Forest	
48	Humer Building	Humer Building	September 29, 1982 (#82002566)	1894 Sheridan Road; 42°11′13″N 87°47′53″W	Highland Park	
49	Jean Butz James Museum of the Highland Park Historical Society	Jean Butz James Museum of the Highland Park Historical Society	September 29, 1982 (#82002567)	326 Central Avenue; 42°11′14″N 87°47′39″W	Highland Park	
50	Jens Jensen Summer House and Studio	Jens Jensen Summer House and Studio	June 19, 1991 (#91000795)	930–950 Dean Avenue; 42°10′12″N 87°46′41″W	Highland Park	
51	Noble Judah Estate	Noble Judah Estate	August 3, 1990 (#90001197)	111 and 211 West Westminster Street; 42°15′09″N 87°51′00″W	Lake Forest	
52	Karcher Hotel	Karcher Hotel	August 9, 2002 (#02000845)	405 Washington Street; 42°21′34″N 87°50′03″W	Waukegan	
53	Lake Bluff Uptown Commercial Historic District	Lake Bluff Uptown Commercial Historic District	November 15, 2006 (#06001021)	20, 31–113 East Scranton, 26-40 (even) East Center Avenue, and 550 North Sheridan; 42°16′46″N 87°50′40″W	Lake Bluff	The historic downtown district of Lake Bluff, Illinois, United States. There are fourteen properties in the district; of these, six buildings, one site, and one object contribute to its historic fabric as contributing properties.
54	Lake Forest Cemetery	Lake Forest Cemetery	May 30, 2001 (#01000597)	1525 North Lake Road; 42°15′52″N 87°49′54″W	Lake Forest	
55	Lake Forest Historic District	Lake Forest Historic District	January 26, 1978 (#78001161)	Roughly bounded by Western, Westleigh, Lake Michigan, and the northern city limits 42°15′03″N 87°49′40″W	Lake Forest	
56	Robert P. Lamont House	Robert P. Lamont House	November 12, 1993 (#93001240)	810 South Ridge Road; 42°13′25″N 87°51′21″W	Lake Forest	
57	Haerman Lanzl House	Haerman Lanzl House	September 29, 1982 (#82002568)	1635 Linden; 42°10′56″N 87°47′34″W	Highland Park	
58	Clifford Milton Leonard Farm	Clifford Milton Leonard Farm	August 10, 2000 (#00000944)	550, 561, 565, 570, 575, 579 Hathaway Circle; 42°14′59″N 87°52′29″W	Lake Forest	
59	Lloyd Lewis House	Lloyd Lewis House	June 15, 1982 (#82002579)	153 Little Saint Mary's Road; 42°15′37″N 87°56′08″W	Libertyville	
60	Libertyville Downtown Historic District		April 21, 2025 (#100011737)	Ten Blocks in Downtown Libertyville Centered Around Milwaukee Ave; 42°16′59″N 87°57′12″W	Libertyville	
61	Libertyville Town Hall		August 10, 2022 (#100007992)	715 North Milwaukee Ave. 42°17′24″N 87°57′18″W	Libertyville	
62	Libertyville High School Brainerd Building	Libertyville High School Brainerd Building	July 16, 2008 (#08000678)	416 W. Park Ave. 42°17′02″N 87°57′31″W	Libertyville	1917 Neoclassical school—the area's first high school building—with a 1929 Gothic Revival gymnasium. Demolished in 2014.
63	Lichtstern House	Lichtstern House	September 29, 1982 (#82002569)	105 South Deere Park Dr. 42°09′17″N 87°45′46″W	Highland Park	
64	Linden Park Place-Belle Avenue Historic District	Linden Park Place-Belle Avenue Historic District	December 13, 1983 (#83003580)	Roughly bounded by Sheridan Road, Elm Pl., Linden, Park, and Central Avenues; 42°11′16″N 87°47′38″W	Highland Park	
65	Howard and Lucy Linn House		November 15, 2005 (#05001257)	555 Shoreacres Dr. 42°17′55″N 87°50′04″W	Lake Bluff	
66	Ernest Loeb House	Ernest Loeb House	May 18, 1983 (#83000321)	1425 Waverly; 42°10′44″N 87°46′57″W	Highland Park	
67	Mr. Fred L. Mandel Jr. House	Mr. Fred L. Mandel Jr. House	December 22, 2009 (#09001122)	2479 Woodbridge Lane; 42°11′53″N 87°47′40″W	Highland Park	
68	Maple Avenue/Maple Lane Historic District	Maple Avenue/Maple Lane Historic District	September 29, 1982 (#82002570)	Maple Avenue and Maple Lane between St. Johns Avenue and Sheridan Road; 42°11′41″N 87°47′58″W	Highland Park	
69	George Madison Millard House	George Madison Millard House	September 29, 1982 (#82002571)	1689 Lake Avenue; 42°11′08″N 87°47′16″W	Highland Park	
70	Sylvester Millard House	Sylvester Millard House	September 29, 1982 (#82002572)	1623 Sylvester Pl. 42°10′56″N 87°47′02″W	Highland Park	
71	Millburn Historic District	Millburn Historic District	September 18, 1979 (#79000851)	U.S. 45, Millburn and Grass Lake Roads; 42°25′34″N 87°59′57″W	Millburn	
72	Mineola Hotel	Mineola Hotel	July 29, 1979 (#79003785)	91 North Cora Street; 42°24′12″N 88°10′33″W	Fox Lake	
73	Robert Hosmer Morse House	Robert Hosmer Morse House	August 10, 2000 (#00000947)	1301 Knollwood Circle; 42°16′26″N 87°52′44″W	Lake Forest	
74	Near North Historic District	Near North Historic District	May 3, 1978 (#78001162)	Roughly bounded by Ash Street, railroad tracks, and Glen Flora Avenue; 42°22′04″N 87°49′47″W	Waukegan	
75	North Shore Sanitary District Tower	North Shore Sanitary District Tower	June 30, 1983 (#83000322)	Cary Avenue; 42°10′04″N 87°46′18″W	Highland Park	
76	Henry I. Paddock House	Henry I. Paddock House	May 30, 2001 (#01000596)	346 Sheridan Road; 42°29′16″N 87°49′21″W	Winthrop Harbor	
77	George Pick House	George Pick House	September 29, 1982 (#82002574)	970 Sheridan Road; 42°10′10″N 87°46′24″W	Highland Park	
78	Proctor Building	Proctor Building	February 5, 1998 (#98000064)	520–30 North Milwaukee Avenue; 42°17′18″N 87°57′15″W	Libertyville	1903 commercial building.
79	Public Service Building	Public Service Building	December 8, 1983 (#83003581)	344-354 North Milwaukee Avenue; 42°17′12″N 87°57′13″W	Libertyville	1928 Gothic Tudor Revival/Neo-Plateresque commercial building built for utility magnate Samuel Insull.
80	Ragdale	Ragdale	June 3, 1976 (#76000717)	1230 North Green Bay Road; 42°15′45″N 87°51′02″W	Lake Forest	
81	Ravinia Park Historic District	Ravinia Park Historic District	September 29, 1982 (#82002575)	Roughly bounded by Lambert Tree Avenue, Sheridan Road, St. Johns Avenue, Rambler Lane, and Ravinia Park Avenue; 42°09′35″N 87°46′26″W	Highland Park	
82	Mrs. Kersey Coates Reed House	Mrs. Kersey Coates Reed House	March 2, 2001 (#01000178)	1315 North Lake Road; 42°15′47″N 87°49′38″W	Lake Forest	
83	Rosewood Park	Rosewood Park	September 29, 1982 (#82002576)	Roger Williams Avenue; 42°09′58″N 87°46′22″W	Highland Park	
84	Edward L. Ryerson Area Historic District	Edward L. Ryerson Area Historic District	February 29, 1996 (#96000086)	21950 North Riverwoods Road; 42°10′39″N 87°54′39″W	Deerfield	
85	Shiloh House	Shiloh House	May 12, 1977 (#77000488)	1300 Shiloh Boulevard; 42°27′02″N 87°49′38″W	Zion	
86	John Taylor Snite House	John Taylor Snite House	August 19, 2003 (#03000790)	225 North Deere Park Avenue E 42°09′29″N 87°45′42″W	Highland Park	
87	C. S. Soule House	C. S. Soule House	September 29, 1982 (#82002577)	304 Laurel Avenue; 42°11′10″N 87°47′33″W	Highland Park	
88	Adlai E. Stevenson II Farm	Adlai E. Stevenson II Farm	September 14, 2003 (#03000918)	25200 N. Saint Mary's Rd. 42°13′44″N 87°55′50″W	Mettawa	
89	Louis F. Swift House	Louis F. Swift House	November 18, 2005 (#05001256)	255 East Foster Place; 42°14′09″N 87°50′28″W	Lake Forest	
90	George E. Van Hagen House		January 12, 2016 (#15000966)	12 W. County Line Rd. 42°09′15″N 88°10′50″W	Barrington Hills	
91	Vine-Oakwood-Green Bay Road Historic District	Vine-Oakwood-Green Bay Road Historic District	March 28, 1980 (#80001381)	Green Bay Road, East Vine and North Oakwood Avenues; 42°14′52″N 87°50′29″W	Lake Forest	
92	Water Tower, Building 49	Water Tower, Building 49	December 4, 1974 (#74000764)	Leonard Wood Avenue; 42°12′59″N 87°48′42″W	Fort Sheridan	
93	Waukegan Building	Waukegan Building	November 21, 2002 (#02001355)	4 South Genesee Street; 42°21′34″N 87°49′54″W	Waukegan	
94	Waukegan Public Library	Waukegan Public Library	December 31, 2013 (#13001003)	1 N. Sheridan Rd. 42°21′35″N 87°49′46″W	Waukegan	
95	West Park Neighborhood Historic District	West Park Neighborhood Historic District	November 14, 2012 (#07000900)	Roughly bounded by Green Bay Rd., Westminster, Oakwood, and Atteridge Rds. 42°15′19″N 87°50′41″W	Lake Forest	
96	Westover Road Non-Commissioned Officers' Housing Historic District	Westover Road Non-Commissioned Officers' Housing Historic District	October 1, 2009 (#08000399)	339-355 Westover Rd. 42°12′50″N 87°49′00″W	Highwood	
97	Ward Winfield Willits House	Ward Winfield Willits House	November 24, 1980 (#80001380)	1445 Sheridan Road; 42°10′44″N 87°47′12″W	Highland Park	
98	Zion Chapter House	Zion Chapter House	November 28, 1980 (#80001382)	2715 Emmaus Avenue; 42°26′44″N 87°49′42″W	Zion	

== Former listings ==
	Name on the Register	Image	Date listed	Date removed	Location	City or town	Description
1	Jewel Tea Company, Inc.	Jewel Tea Company, Inc.	February 3, 2004 (#03001462)	January 2, 2020	511 Lake Zurich Road; 42°09′40″N 88°07′40″W	Barrington	Building demolished in 2004.
2	Obee House		September 29, 1982 (#82002573)	January 2, 2020	1642 Green Bay Road; 42°11′08″N 87°48′47″W	Highland Park	Demolished in late 1990s.
3	Zion Hospice		June 18, 1976 (#76000718)	March 13, 1980	2561 Sheridan Rd.	Zion	Demolished in November, 1979

== See also ==
- List of National Historic Landmarks in Illinois
- National Register of Historic Places listings in Illinois
