= Public Service Building =

Public Service Building may refer to:

- Public Service Building (Denver, Colorado), listed on the National Register of Historic Places in Denver
- Public Service Building (Libertyville, Illinois), listed on the National Register of Historic Places in Illinois
- Public Service Building (Portland, Oregon), a private office building
- Portland Building, in Portland, Oregon, a government building referred to in some documents as the Portland Public Service Building
- Public Service Building (Milwaukee, Wisconsin), listed on the National Register of Historic Places in Wisconsin
- City Public Service Company Building, in San Antonio, Texas, listed on the National Register of Historic Places in Texas
- Public Service of Oklahoma Building, in Tulsa, Oklahoma, listed on the National Register of Historic Places in Oklahoma
- Western Public Service Building, in Scottsbluff, Nebraska, listed on the National Register of Historic Places in Nebraska
