= Louis Fredrick House =

Historic house in Illinois, United States

- U.S. National Register of Historic Places
- Location within Chicago metropolitan area Location within Illinois Location within the United States
- Location: 19 W. County Line Rd., Barrington Hills, Illinois
- Coordinates: 42°09′15″N 88°11′04″W
- Built: 1957
- Architect: Frank Lloyd Wright
- Architectural style: Usonian
- NRHP reference No.: 100003649
- Added to NRHP: June 24, 2019

The Louis Fredrick House is a house designed by Frank Lloyd Wright at 19 W. County Line Road in Barrington Hills, Illinois. The house was built in 1957 for Louis Fredrick, an affluent interior designer. The house's design is typical of Wright's later work, in which he adapted his Usonian design principles to larger homes for wealthier clients. Fredrick played a role in the design process as well, rejecting Wright's original plan on account of its concrete block walls and providing input on decisions such as coloring. The house's design includes a brick exterior, long horizontal window bands, a low roof covered with cedar shakes, and a large chimney.

The house was added to the National Register of Historic Places on January 12, 2016. That year, the house was sold through auction to David and Joyce McArdle. The McArdles had previously owned and restored another Wright building, the F.B. Henderson House in Elmhurst, Illinois. The couple approached John Eifler, of Eifler & Associates, to restore the home, which included adding geothermal heating and cooling, and the construction of furniture that had originally been intended for the home. This restoration was complete by 2018.

== See also ==
- List of Frank Lloyd Wright works
- National Register of Historic Places listings in Lake County, Illinois
