= Lloyd Lewis House =

Historic house in Illinois, United States

- U.S. National Register of Historic Places
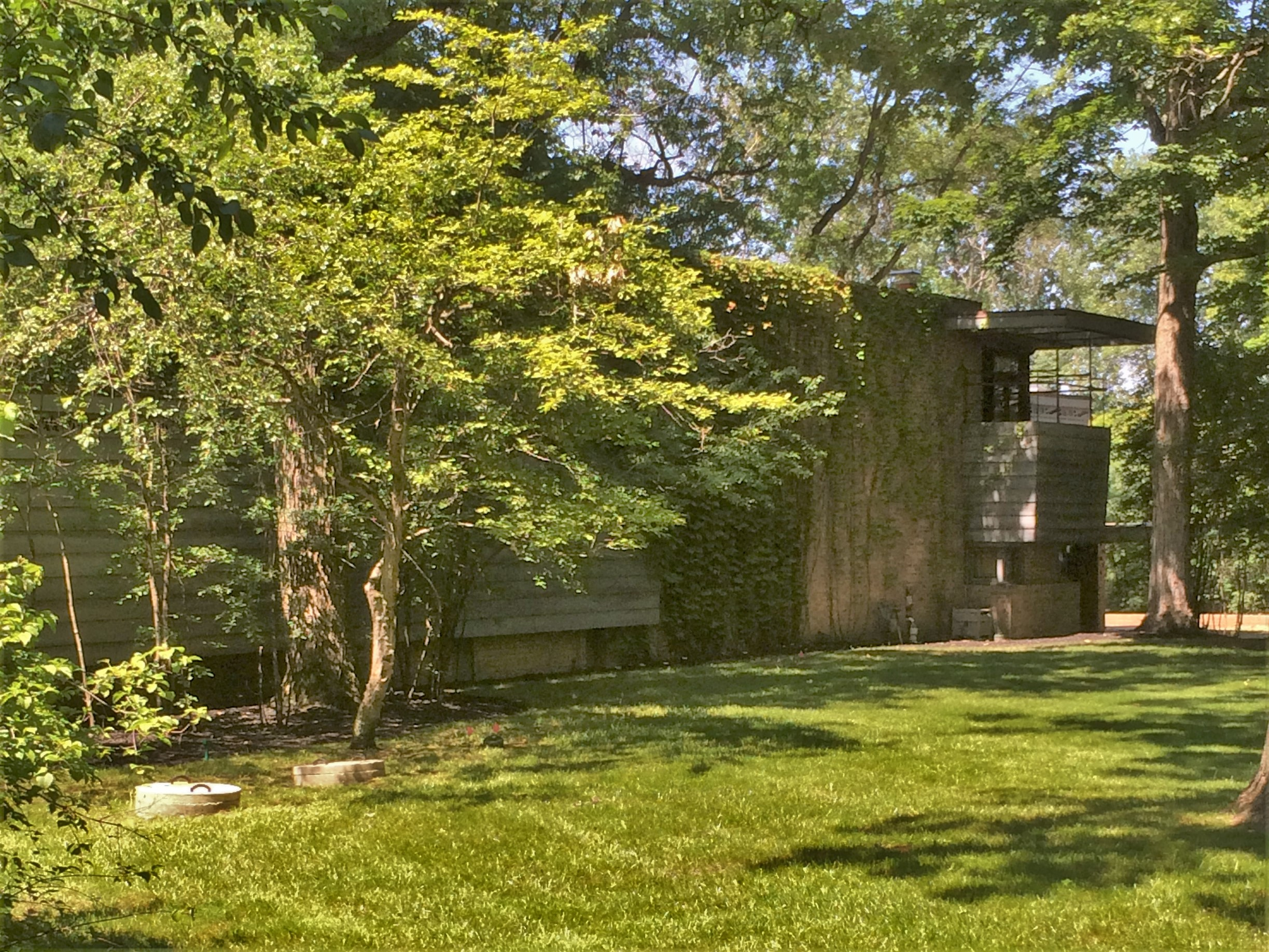

- Location within Illinois Location within the United States
- Location: 153 Little St. Mary's Road, Libertyville, Illinois
- Coordinates: 42°15′30.72″N 87°56′6.43″W
- Built: 1939
- Architect: Frank Lloyd Wright
- Architectural style: Usonian
- NRHP reference No.: 82002579
- Added to NRHP: June 15, 1982

The Lloyd Lewis House in Libertyville, Illinois is a Usonian house designed by Frank Lloyd Wright and built in 1939. It was listed on the National Register of Historic Places in 1982. The client for this house was the editor of the Chicago Daily News. This is a two-story house located near the Des Plaines River.

== See also ==
- List of Frank Lloyd Wright works
- National Register of Historic Places listings in Lake County, Illinois
