= Mary W. Adams House =

Historic house in Highland Park, Illinois

- U.S. National Register of Historic Places
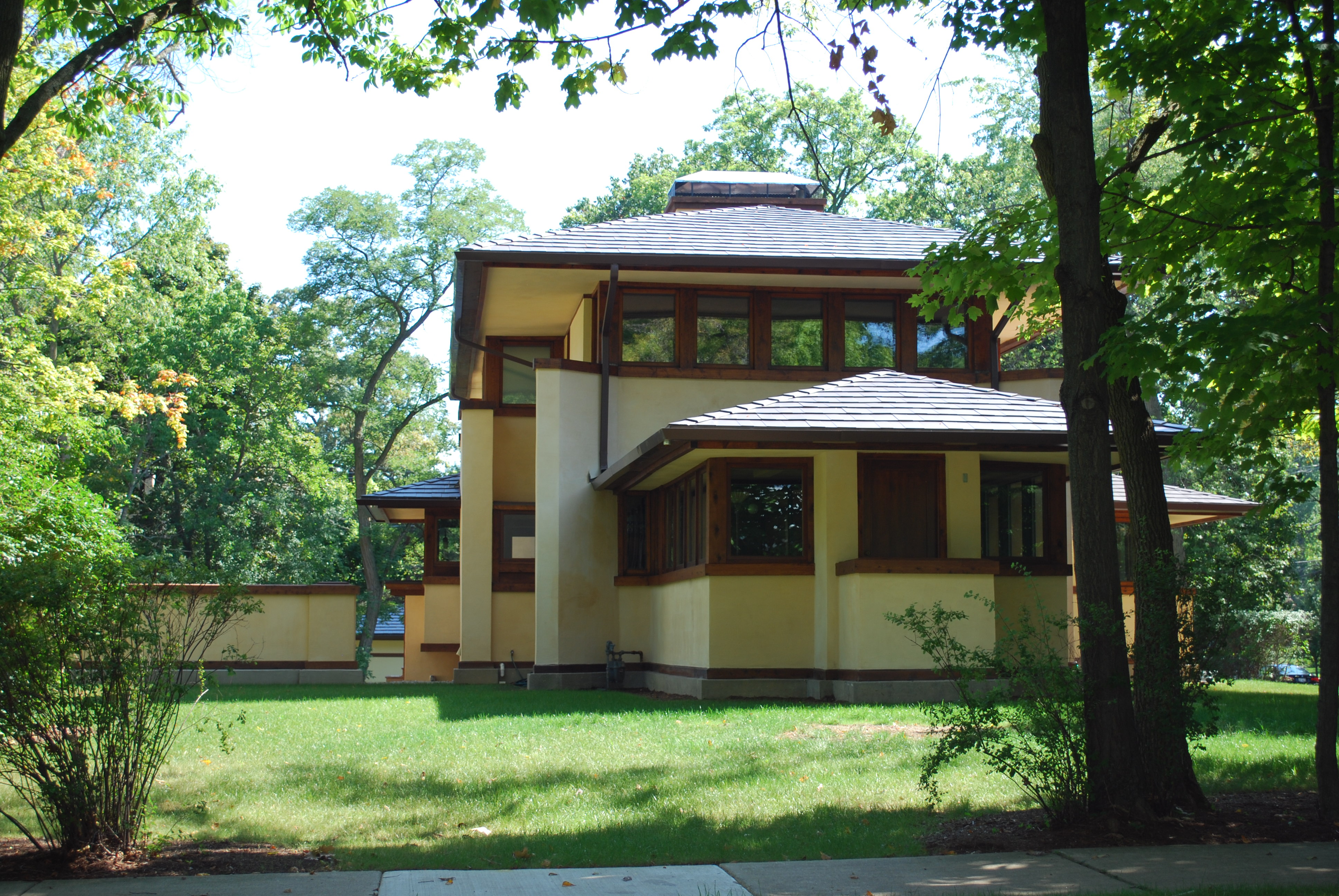

- Location within Illinois
- Location: 1923 Lake Avenue, Highland Park, Illinois
- Coordinates: 42°11′14.54″N 87°47′20.24″W
- Built: 1905
- Architect: Frank Lloyd Wright
- Architectural style: Prairie School
- NRHP reference No.: 82002552
- Added to NRHP: September 29, 1982

The Mary W. Adams House is located at 1923 Lake Avenue in Highland Park, Illinois. Designed by Frank Lloyd Wright in the Prairie style and built in 1905, the Adams House is a two-story home with three bedrooms and two bathrooms with a light stucco exterior and wooden trim that emphasizes the horizontal.

The house was listed on the National Register of Historic Places on September 29, 1982, as part of the Highland Park Multiple Resource Area. The Highland Park Historic Preservation Commission named it a local landmark in 2011. The current owners received the Highland Park 2012 Historic Preservation Award for Restoration.

== History ==
Widowed Mary W. Adams, who was a teacher in the Christian Science movement, hired architect Frank Lloyd Wright to design her a house in 1905. Adams was 70 years old, making her Wright's oldest client.

Wright submitted an initial plan which had porches at the extremities, but Adams rejected it as too costly. Adams approved of a second draft, which removed the south porch and made the dining room an open view and the house reflects this design. An interesting feature of the building is its diagonal corner buttresses which are not structural, but serve to dramatically emphasize the extension of the roof. The exterior is stucco with cypress wood trim and the interior wood is southern yellow pine with quarter-sawn white oak floors. The original tan Roman brick fireplace has been restored. Wright designed a small storage building for the house which has also been restored. The house had rooms for a maid and servant. It was designed with a call system so that Adams could request help from anywhere in the house, even the porch. The building sits on a corner lot, four houses down the street from Lake Michigan. It is reminiscent of what would become Wright's A Fireproof House for $5000 design.

Adams lived in the house for only three years before her death and is buried with her husband in Lowell, Massachusetts.

The house was listed as a short sale in the 2000s and its fate was uncertain. It needed extensive restoration work. New owners purchased the home in December 2010 and embarked upon an 18-month restoration using the original plans of Frank Lloyd Wright.

== See also ==
- List of Frank Lloyd Wright works
- National Register of Historic Places listings in Lake County, Illinois
