= West Park Neighborhood Historic District =

Historic district in Illinois, United States

- U.S. National Register of Historic Places
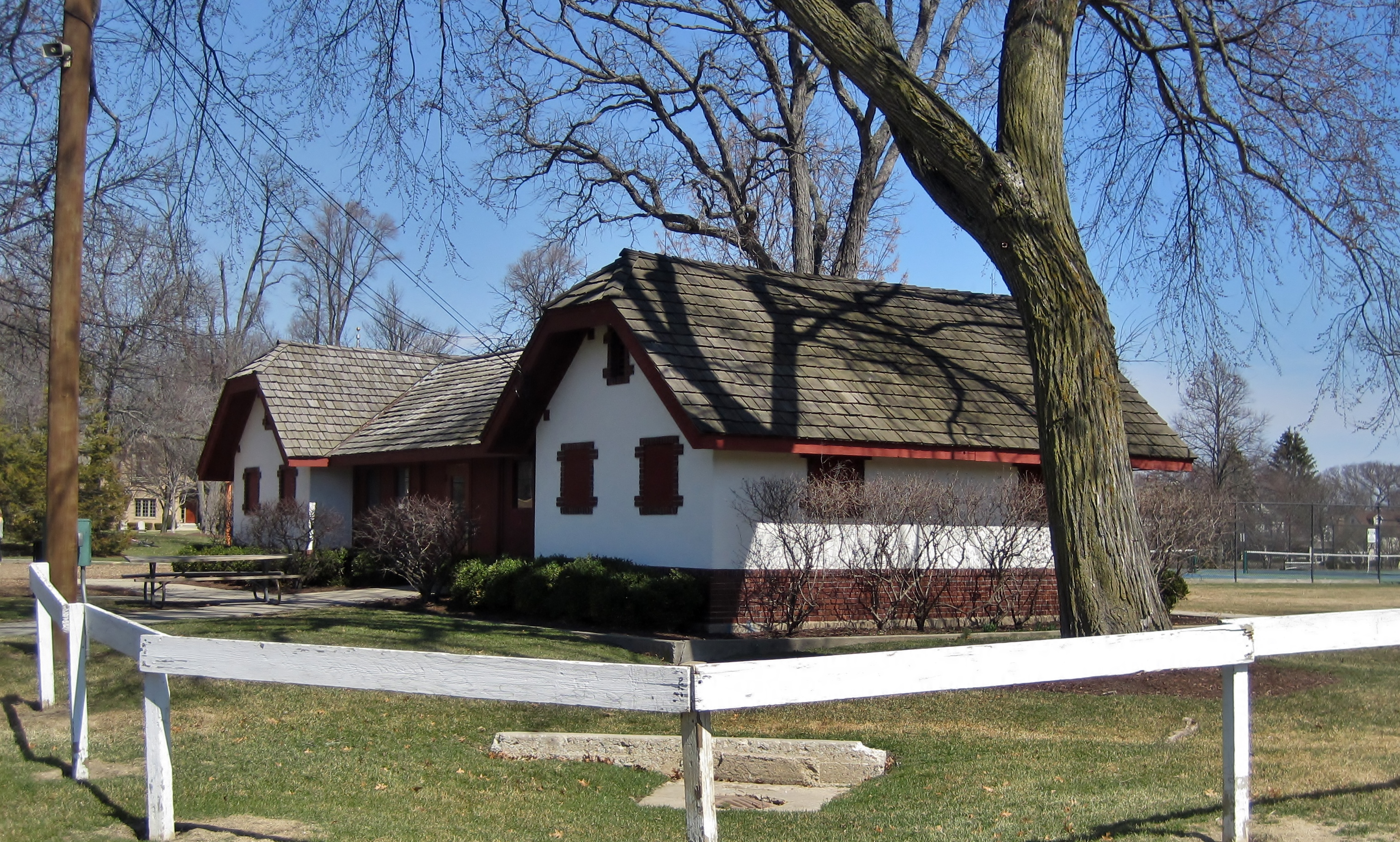

- Location within Chicago metropolitan area Location within Illinois Location within the United States
- Location: Roughly bounded by Green Bay Rd., Westminster, Oakwood, and Atteridge Rds., Lake Forest, Illinois
- Coordinates: 42°15′19″N 87°50′41″W
- Area: 25 acres (10 ha)
- NRHP reference No.: 07000900
- Added to NRHP: November 14, 2012

The West Park Neighborhood Historic District is a residential historic district surrounding West Park in Lake Forest, Illinois. The district includes 149 contributing buildings, most of which were built between 1907 and 1930, and West Park. Originally known as the Green Bay Addition, the neighborhood was planned in 1907 as the equivalent of a company town for the service workers at Lake Forest's many estates. Lake Forest was a popular home for the Chicago area's most wealthy residents in the early twentieth century, who typically built large estates that required teams of support workers to maintain. Architect Howard Van Doren Shaw, who also designed many of the estates, planned the neighborhood. While Shaw intended for the development to mainly use Tudor Revival architecture, few houses were designed in the style; the Colonial Revival, Folk Victorian, Craftsman, and American Foursquare styles were more common.

The district was added to the National Register of Historic Places on November 14, 2012.
