= Proctor Building (Libertyville, Illinois) =

- U.S. National Register of Historic Places
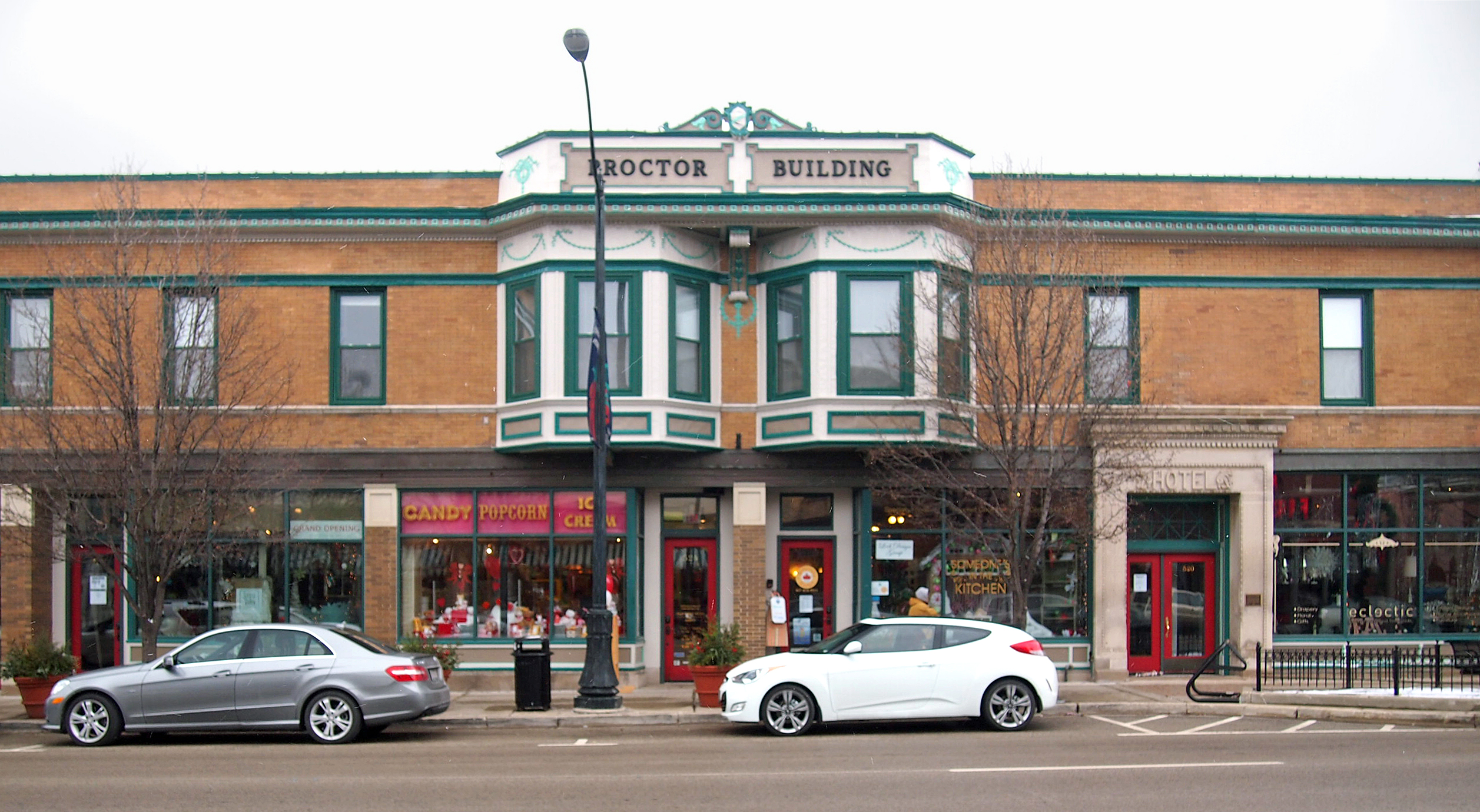

- Location within Chicago metropolitan area Location within Illinois Location within the United States
- Location: 520-30 N. Milwaukee Ave., Libertyville, Illinois
- Coordinates: 42°17′18″N 87°57′15″W
- Area: less than one acre
- Built: 1903
- Architect: William G. Krieg
- NRHP reference No.: 98000064
- Added to NRHP: February 5, 1998

The Proctor Building is a historic hotel and commercial building at 520-30 N. Milwaukee Avenue in Libertyville, Illinois. The building was constructed in 1903 during a period of commercial growth in Libertyville spurred by new passenger rail connections to Chicago. The three brothers R.J., C.W., and R.E. Proctor and their cousin E.W. Proctor were the original owners of the building, which was the largest of Libertyville's three hotels when it opened. Architect William G. Krieg designed the building, which features three-sided oriel windows and an elaborate limestone entrance to the hotel. Major businesses such as A&P, Woolworth's, and Jewel occupied the building's first-floor commercial spaces, while the second-floor hotel hosted visitors and became a focal point of the city's business and social circles.

The building was added to the National Register of Historic Places on February 5, 1998.
