= C. S. Soule House =

Historic house in Illinois, United States

- U.S. National Register of Historic Places
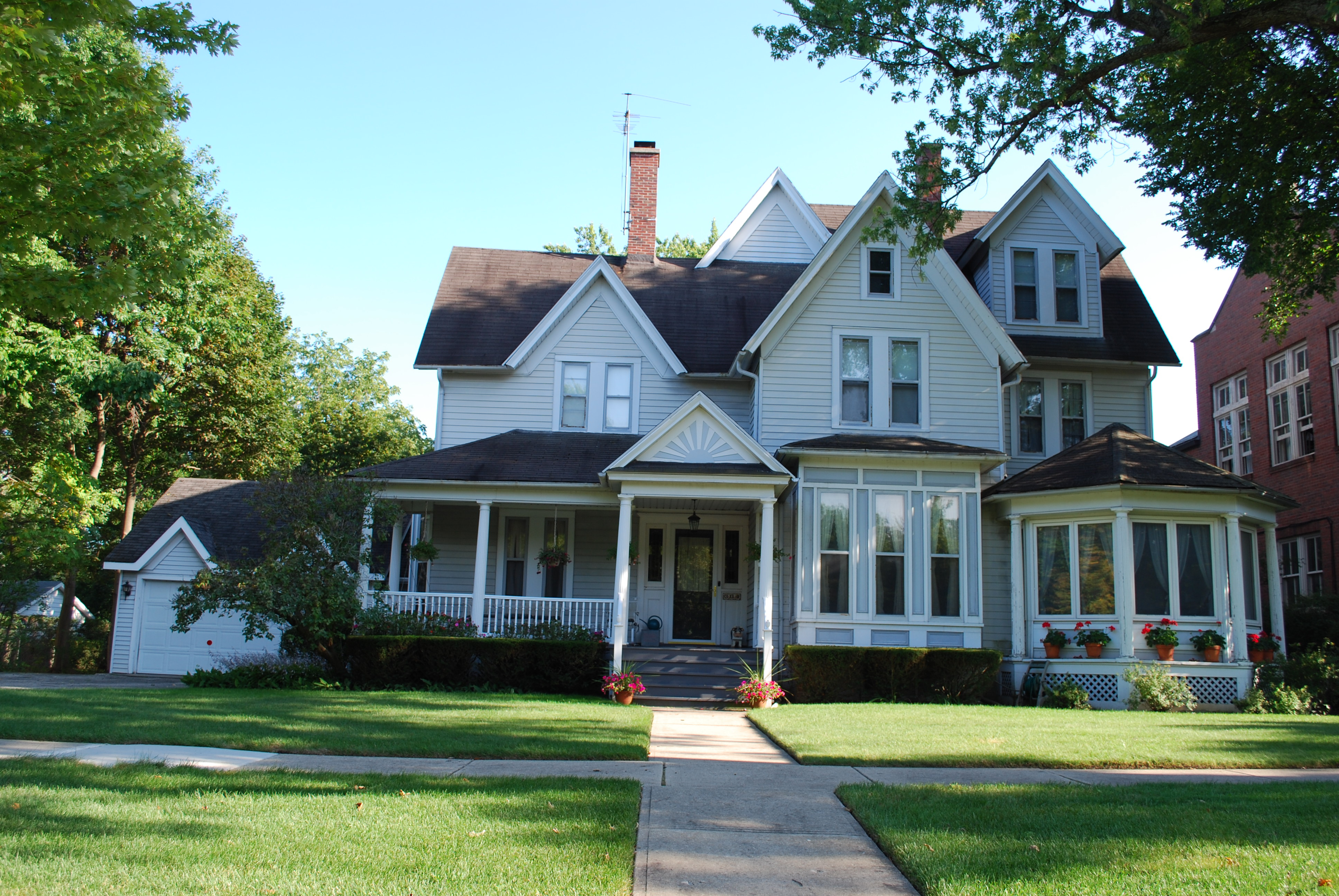

- Location within Chicago metropolitan area Location within Illinois Location within the United States
- Location: 304 Laurel Ave., Highland Park, Illinois
- Coordinates: 42°11′10″N 87°47′33″W
- Area: 0.5 acres (0.20 ha)
- Architectural style: Gothic Revival
- MPS: Highland Park MRA
- NRHP reference No.: 82002577
- Added to NRHP: September 29, 1982

The C. S. Soule House is a historic house at 304 Laurel Avenue in Highland Park, Illinois. The house's builder and construction date are uncertain, but it was most likely built circa 1880. Its first documented resident was C. S. Soule, the pastor at the Highland Park Presbyterian Church and a professor at the Highland Hall women's school; Soule lived in the house from 1880 to 1886. The house has a Gothic Revival design with several front-facing gables, a three-bay window, and an open porch. The property originally had a barn behind the house; this was demolished in 1978, and an attached two-car garage was added the following year.

The house was added to the National Register of Historic Places on September 29, 1982.
