= Jean Butz James Museum =

Historic house in Illinois, United States

- Jean Butz James Museum of the Highland Park Historical Society
- U.S. National Register of Historic Places
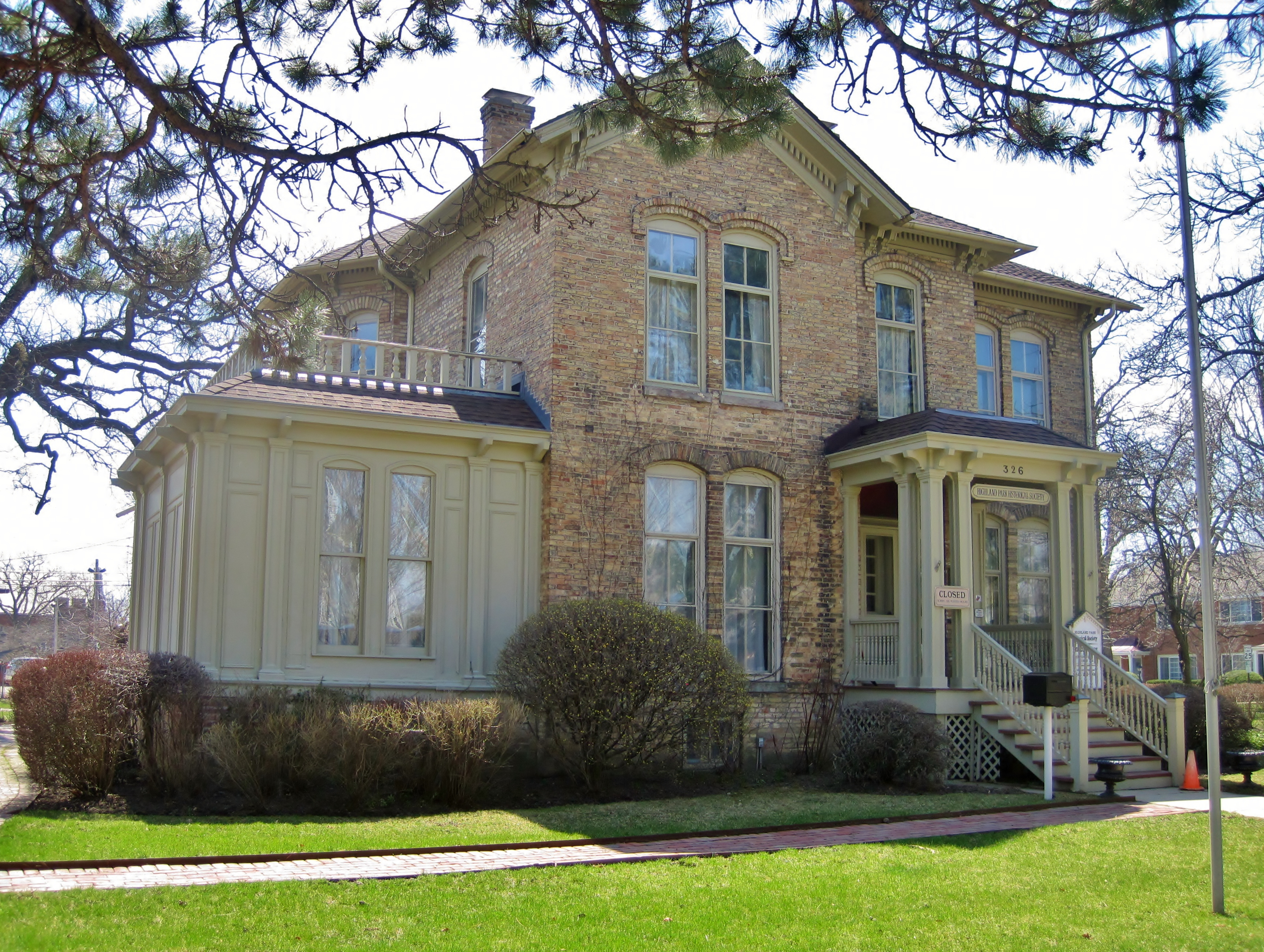

- Location within Chicago metropolitan area Location within Illinois Location within the United States
- Location: 326 Central Ave., Highland Park, Illinois
- Coordinates: 42°11′14″N 87°47′39″W
- Area: 0.8 acres (0.32 ha)
- Built: 1871
- Built by: Highland Park Building Co.
- Architectural style: Italianate
- MPS: Highland Park MRA
- NRHP reference No.: 82002567
- Added to NRHP: September 29, 1982

The Jean Butz James Museum is a historic house and former museum at 326 Central Avenue in Highland Park, Illinois. The Italianate house was built in 1871, two years after Highland Park's establishment. The Highland Park Building Company built the house without a buyer, as it expected that the new city would attract many affluent Chicagoans in the coming years. Its design includes a yellow brick exterior, bracketed eaves, and a widow's walk. The Highland Park Historical Society bought the house in 1969 and converted it to a historic house museum, which opened in 1972.

The house was added to the National Register of Historic Places on September 29, 1982. The Highland Park Historical Society closed the museum and relocated in 2015.
