= Near North Historic District =

Historic district in Illinois, United States

- U.S. National Register of Historic Places
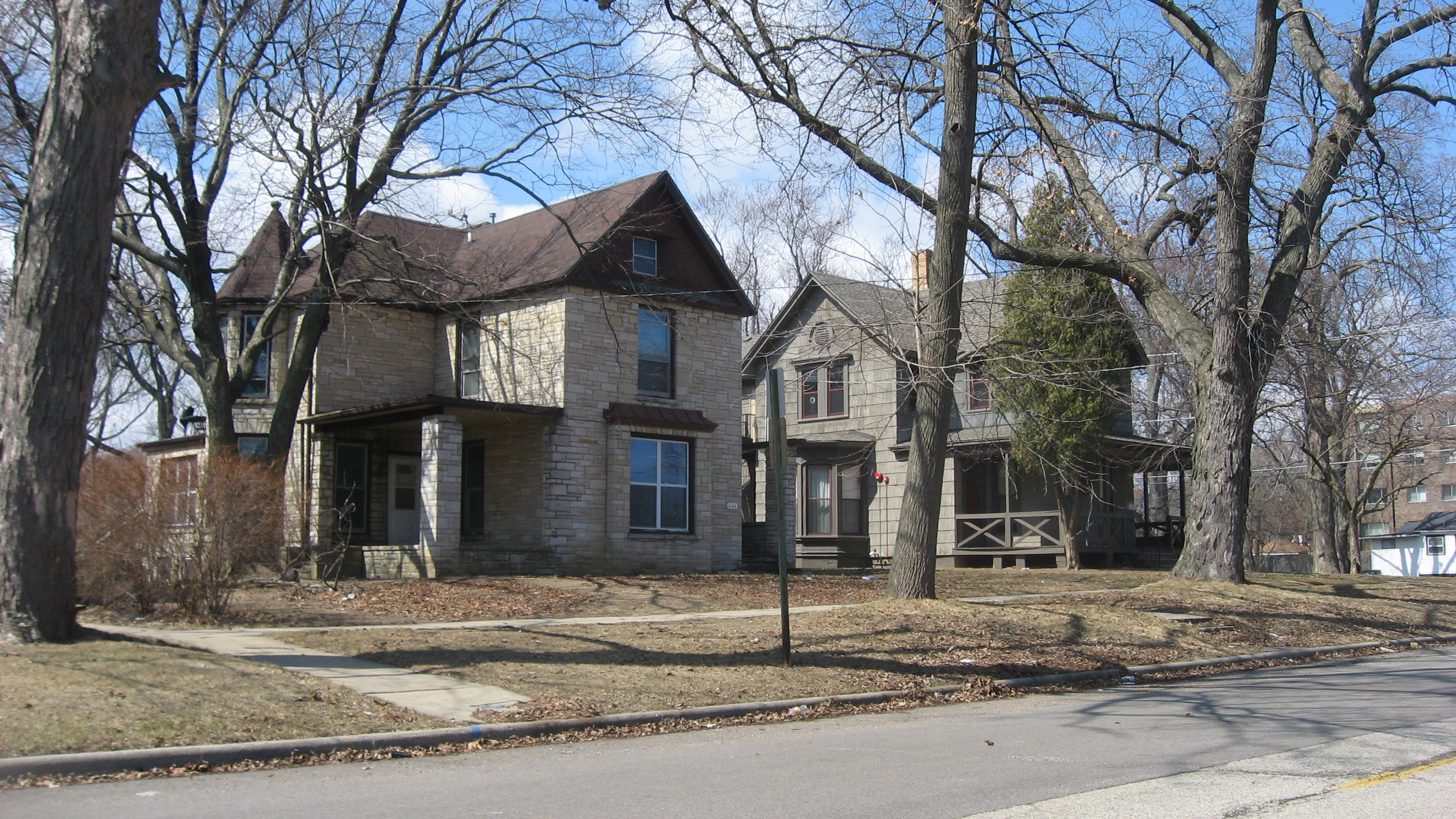

- Location within Illinois Location within the United States
- Location: Roughly bounded by Ash St., RR. tracks, Glen Flora Ave., Waukegan, Illinois
- Coordinates: 42°22′04″N 87°49′47″W
- Area: 203 acres (82 ha)
- NRHP reference No.: 78001162
- Added to NRHP: May 3, 1978

The Near North Historic District is a national historic district in Waukegan, Illinois. The district consists of a residential area that grew northward from Waukegan's downtown in the nineteenth and early twentieth centuries. The oldest building in the district is from the 1840s, shortly after the city was incorporated, while the newest contributing building is from 1928. Nearly every popular architectural style of the period is included within the district, with older styles such as Greek Revival and Italianate being especially prevalent. While Waukegan expanded considerably and became an industrial port city in the twentieth century, the district is largely undisturbed by both industry and modern construction.

The district was added to the National Register of Historic Places on May 3, 1978.
