= Obee House =

Historic house in Illinois, United States

- Formerly listed on the U.S. National Register of Historic Places
- Location within Chicago metropolitan area Location within Illinois Location within the United States
- Location: 1642 Green Bay Rd., Highland Park, Illinois
- Coordinates: 42°11′08″N 87°48′47″W
- Area: 0.3 acres (0.12 ha)
- Built: c. 1874
- MPS: Highland Park MRA
- NRHP reference No.: 82002573

Significant dates
- Added to NRHP: September 29, 1982
- Removed from NRHP: January 2, 2020

The Obee House was a historic house at 1642 Green Bay Road in Highland Park, Illinois. The house was built circa 1874 for the Obee family, who owned the house for a century following its construction. The house had a vernacular clapboard form with Victorian elements. Its decorative features included a bay window and hooded window moldings. Its interior featured a wooden staircase, detailed baseboards, and pine flooring.

The house was added to the National Register of Historic Places on September 29, 1982. It was demolished in the late 1990s and replaced by a condominium development and removed from the National Register in 2020.
