= Waukegan Building =

- U.S. National Register of Historic Places
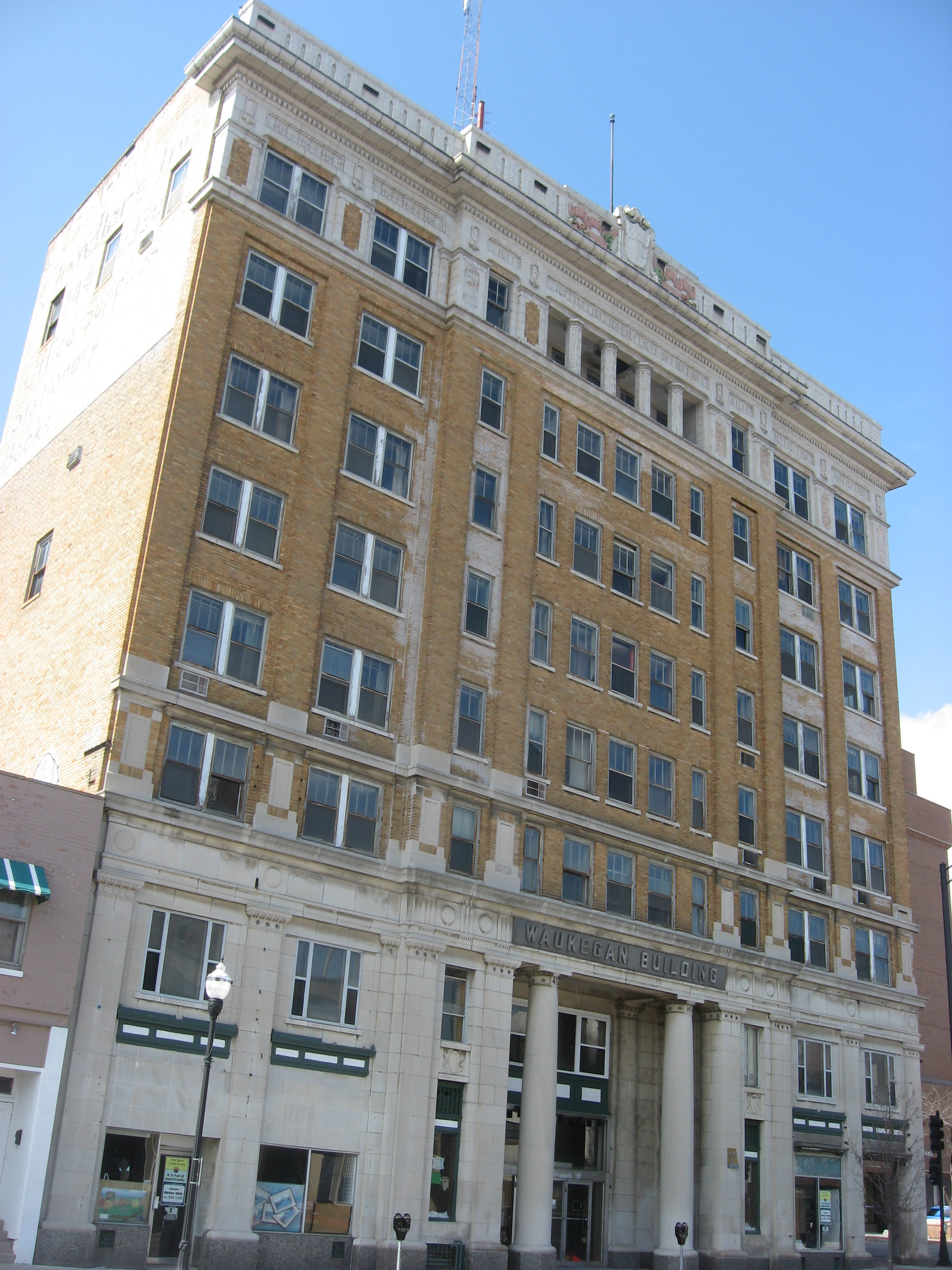
- The Waukegan Building in 2014

- Location within Illinois Location within the United States
- Interactive map showing the location of Waukegan Building
- Location: 4 S. Genesee St., Waukegan, Illinois
- Coordinates: 42°21′41″N 87°49′55″W
- Area: less than one acre
- Built: 1925
- Built by: St. Louis Bank Equipment Company
- Architectural style: Classical Revival
- NRHP reference No.: 02001355
- Added to NRHP: November 21, 2002

The Waukegan Building is a historic skyscraper in Waukegan, Illinois, United States. Located in what was the central business district, it was the city's first skyscraper when it opened in March 1925.

== History ==
By 1920, Waukegan, Illinois had grown to a small city with a population nearing 20,000, a 19.6% increase over the previous decade. The Waukegan National Bank Corporation was founded in 1914 to provide capital to the growing population. However, the bank quickly outgrew its original three-story headquarters at the corner of Genesee and Washington Streets. In 1924, they hired the St. Louis Bank Equipment Company to build a much larger building on the same site. The bank opened for a public viewing on March 7, 1925. Upon its opening, it became the tallest building in Lake County.

The original tenants were the Waukegan National Bank, the Public Service Company of Northern Illinois, and a Walgreens. The Chicago Chamber of Commerce had an office on the eighth floor. Various professionals such as physicians and attorneys occupied other suites. The Great Depression hit the bank hard and by 1931 the Waukegan National Bank was bankrupt. The Citizens National Bank moved into the vacated offices and operated for six years. A variety of retail stores and professional firms have occupied the space since. It has been largely vacant since 1985.

The Waukegan Building is generally Neoclassical in design. The eight-story building has an L-shaped plan with the main elevation on Genesee Street. Exterior walls are light brown brick with limestone details. Built on a concrete foundation, the tower has a flat roof with two antennas. The main facade is divided in a typical tripartite design.
