= Hotel Waukegan =

- U.S. National Register of Historic Places
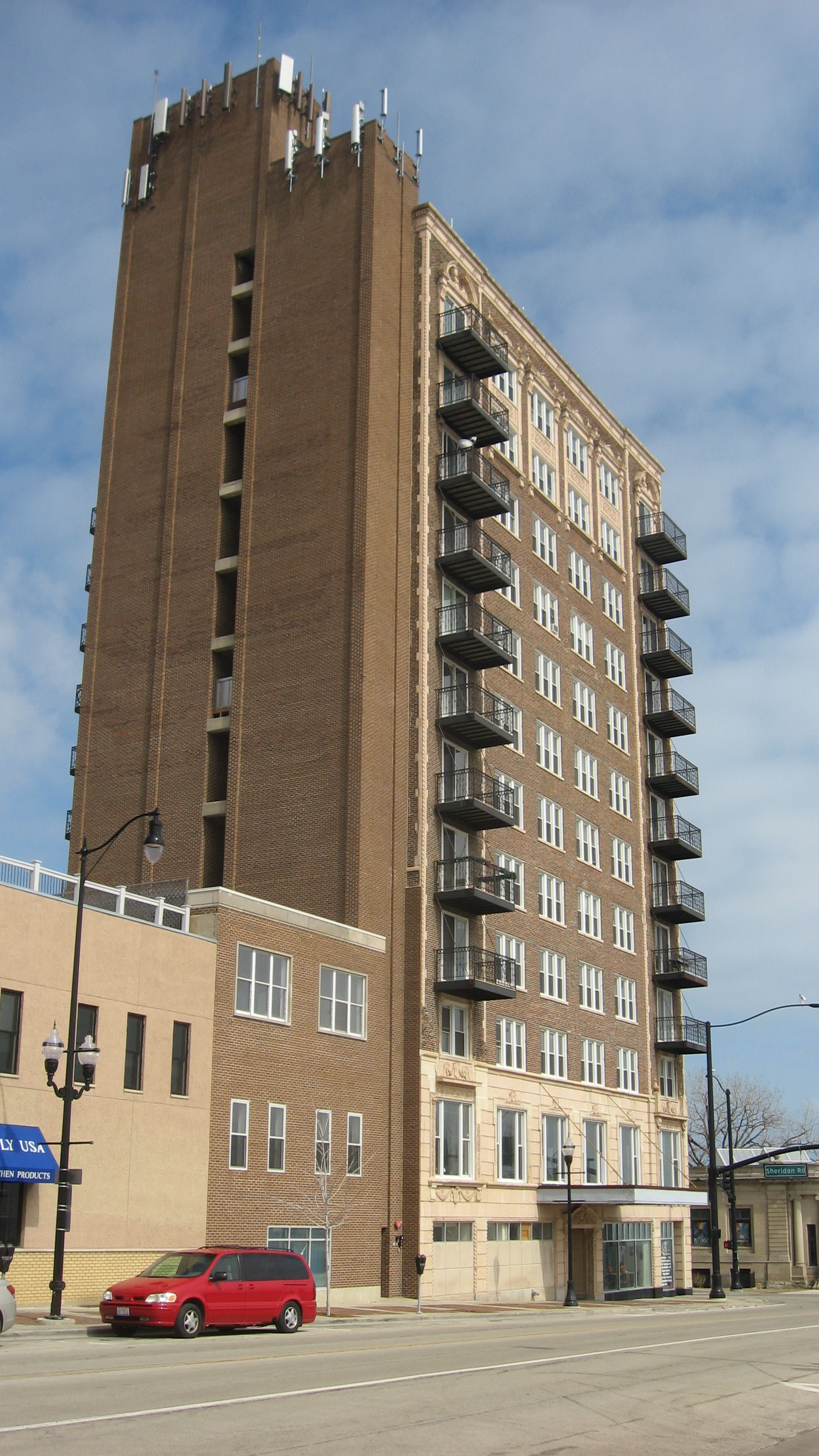
- Location: 102 Washington St., Waukegan, Illinois
- Coordinates: 42°21′35″N 87°49′48″W
- Area: less than one acre
- Architectural style: Renaissance Revival
- NRHP reference No.: 94001269
- Added to NRHP: October 28, 1994

The Hotel Waukegan is a historic hotel building located at 102 Washington Street in Waukegan, Illinois. At an original height of 12 stories and 132 feet (40 m), the hotel is the tallest building in the city. Its architecture is primarily Renaissance Revival but incorporates a variety of styles; its decorative elements include elaborate terra cotta details on the upper and lower stories and quoin-like terra cotta at its corners. The hotel opened in 1927 during a population and economic boom in Waukegan; it is the better-preserved of the city's two surviving hotels from this period. While the hotel struggled financially in its early years, it stabilized in the 1930s; from then on, it served as both a modern hotel for travelers and laborers and a meeting place for community events.

The building was added to the National Register of Historic Places on October 28, 1994.
