= Shiloh House (Zion, Illinois) =

Historic house in Illinois, United States

- U.S. National Register of Historic Places
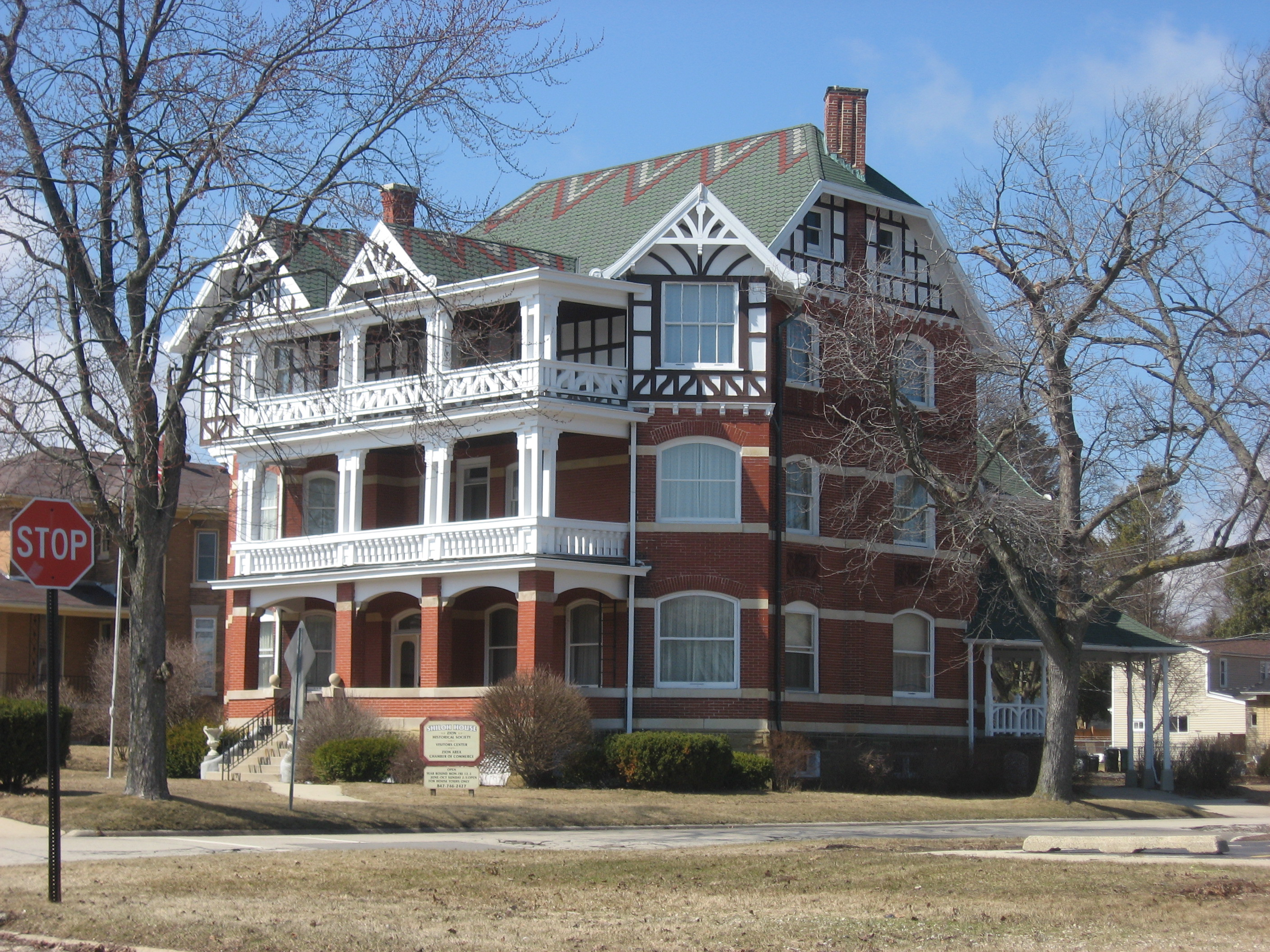

- Location within Illinois Location within the United States
- Location: 1300 Shiloh Blvd., Zion, Illinois
- Coordinates: 42°27′02″N 87°49′38″W
- Area: 0.8 acres (0.32 ha)
- Built: 1902-03
- Architect: Burkhardt, Paul
- Architectural style: Queen Anne, Swiss Chalet
- NRHP reference No.: 77000488
- Added to NRHP: May 12, 1977

Shiloh House is a historic house at 1300 Shiloh Boulevard in Zion, Illinois. John Alexander Dowie, the founder of Zion, built the house in 1902–03; he lived there until his death in 1907. Architect Paul Burkhardt of Chicago, who worked on many of Zion's early buildings, designed the home. Burkhardt's design incorporated the Queen Anne and Swiss chalet styles. After Dowie's death, the house passed through several owners, including the Great Lakes Bible Institute; the school used the house for twelve years before moving to Missouri in 1945. The Zion Historical Society bought the house and renovated it for a new headquarters in 1967.

The house was added to the National Register of Historic Places on May 12, 1977.
