= Highland Park Water Tower =

- U.S. National Register of Historic Places
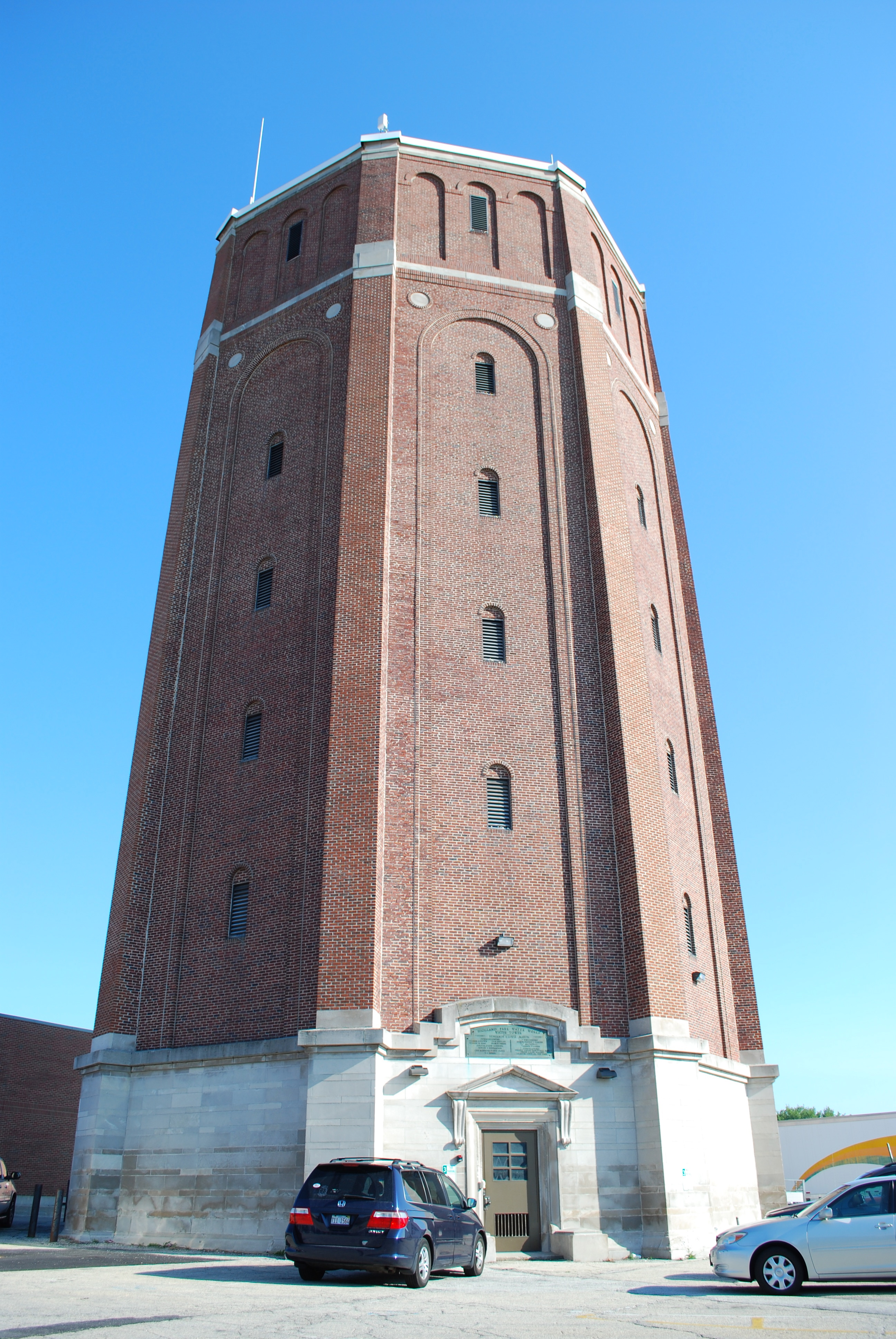

- Location within Chicago metropolitan area Location within Illinois Location within the United States
- Location: West side of Green Bay Rd. north of Central, Highland Park, Illinois
- Coordinates: 42°11′09″N 87°48′15″W
- Area: 0.2 acres (0.081 ha)
- Built: 1929-30
- Built by: Coffin, Pearse, Greeley & Hansen
- MPS: Highland Park MRA
- NRHP reference No.: 82002564
- Added to NRHP: September 29, 1982

The Highland Park Water Tower is a historic water tower on the west side of Green Bay Road in Highland Park, Illinois. Built in 1929–30, the brick water tower is 125 feet (38 m) tall, making it the tallest structure in Highland Park. The tower is Highland Park's third water tower and serves as a visual and symbolic landmark for the city. Its design features tall brick arches on its eight sides and a classical pediment above its entrance. The tower's water tank is capable of holding 500,000 U.S. gallons (1,900,000 L).

The tower was added to the National Register of Historic Places on September 29, 1982.
