= Lake Forest Historic District =

Historic district in Illinois, United States

- U.S. National Register of Historic Places
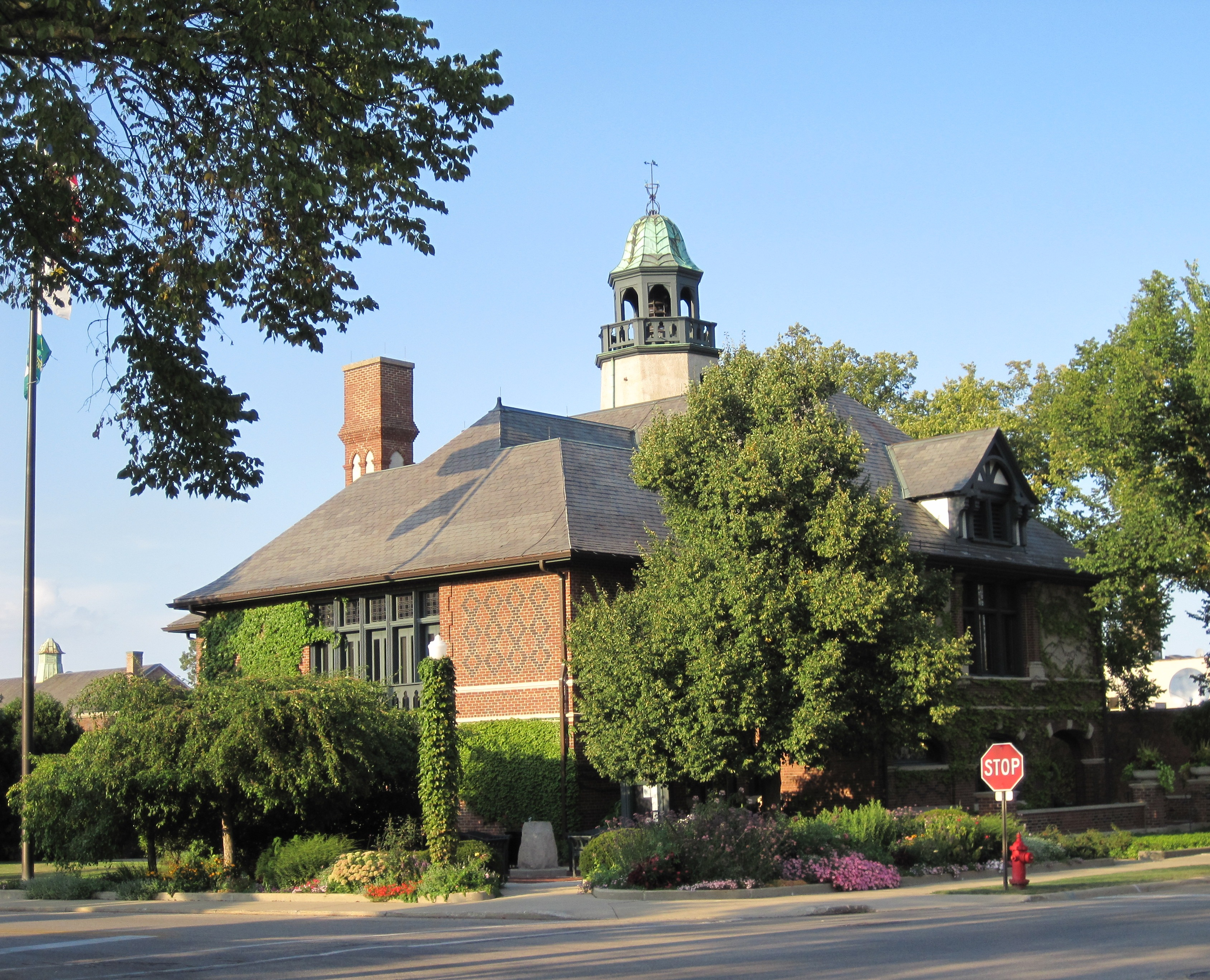
- Lake Forest City Hall

- Location within Chicago metropolitan area Location within Illinois Location within the United States
- Location: Roughly bounded by Western, Westleigh, Lake Michigan, and N city limits, Lake Forest, Illinois
- Coordinates: 42°15′03″N 87°49′40″W
- Area: 1,019 acres (412 ha)
- NRHP reference No.: 78001161
- Added to NRHP: January 26, 1978

The Lake Forest Historic District is a national historic district encompassing much of the original town area of Lake Forest, Illinois. The district is primarily residential, though it also includes three educational institutions and two significant commercial districts. In the late nineteenth and early twentieth centuries, Lake Forest became a popular suburb for the Chicago area's wealthiest residents, and many prominent Chicago businesspeople built their homes in the town. The district's architecture is lavish, reflecting the wealth of its residents, and includes works by Charles Sumner Frost, Dwight H. Perkins, and Howard Van Doren Shaw. The district also includes several buildings on the campus of Lake Forest College, the founding of which spurred the growth of Lake Forest, and Market Square, the country's first planned shopping center.

The district was added to the National Register of Historic Places on January 26, 1978.
