= Ross J. Beatty House =

Historic house in Illinois, United States

- U.S. National Register of Historic Places
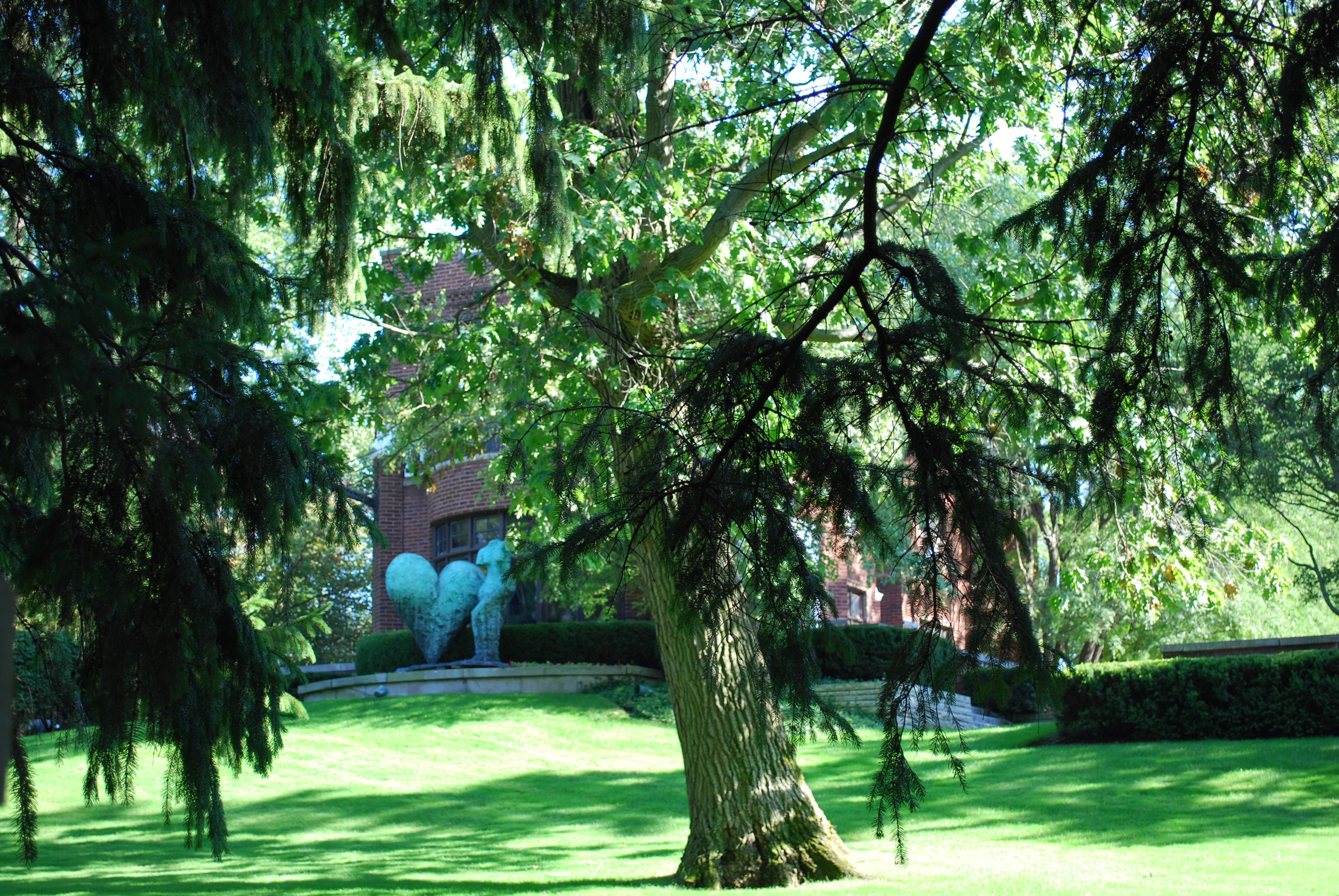

- Location within Chicago metropolitan area Location within Illinois Location within the United States
- Location: 344 Ravine Dr., Highland Park, Illinois
- Coordinates: 42°10′53″N 87°47′23″W
- Area: 1.8 acres (0.73 ha)
- Built: c. 1909
- Architectural style: Tudor Revival
- MPS: Highland Park MRA
- NRHP reference No.: 82002553
- Added to NRHP: September 29, 1982

The Ross J. Beatty House, also known as Halcyon Hall, is a historic house at 344 Ravine Drive in Highland Park, Illinois. Built circa 1909, the house was the second of two homes built in Highland Park for steel magnate Ross J. Beatty. Originally situated on a large lot, the house is a Tudor Revival-style mansion with a carriage house, greenhouse, and gazebo on its grounds. Its lot was later subdivided, and multiple other houses now stand on its former grounds. The house's design includes a brick exterior, bas-relief stone carvings, decorative half-timbering, and a complex roof with several dormers and chimneys.

The house was added to the National Register of Historic Places on September 29, 1982. Beatty's other home in Highland Park, the Ross Beatty House, is also listed on the National Register.<ref name="nris"

As of 2025, the house has been extremely altered in appearance and remains privately owned.
