= Mildred and Abel Fagen House =

Historic house in Illinois, United States

- U.S. National Register of Historic Places
- Location within Chicago metropolitan area Location within Illinois Location within the United States
- Location: 1711 Devonshire Ln., Lake Forest, Illinois
- Coordinates: 42°12′30″N 87°53′17″W
- Built: 1948
- Architect: Keck & Keck
- Architectural style: Modernist
- NRHP reference No.: 100006090
- Added to NRHP: February 4, 2021

The Mildred and Abel Fagen House is a historic house at 1711 Devonshire Lane in Lake Forest, Illinois. Its address at the time of its construction was 1581 Old Mill Road, but the surrounding acreage was eventually sold to developer Arthur Rubloff, who added a number of new streets to service the many additional homes that were built on the former Fagen property. The house was built in 1948 for Mildred Fagen, a patron and leader in the local arts community, and her husband Abel, a textile broker. Prominent Modern Movement architects Keck & Keck designed the house, which was heavily influenced by Frank Lloyd Wright's Usonian work. The one-story house has a flat roof with overhanging eaves, giving it a horizontal emphasis that reflects the area's flat landscape. The house's use of natural materials such as wood, glass, and limestone and its lack of ornamental features continue the emphasis on blending in with its surroundings. The interior design includes a low-ceilinged foyer leading to a larger dining room, stone fireplaces used as focal points, and a narrow hallway leading to the bedrooms, all of which were typical elements of Wright's Usonian plans.

The house was added to the National Register of Historic Places on February 4, 2021.
