= Ross Beatty House =

Historic house in Illinois, United States

- U.S. National Register of Historic Places
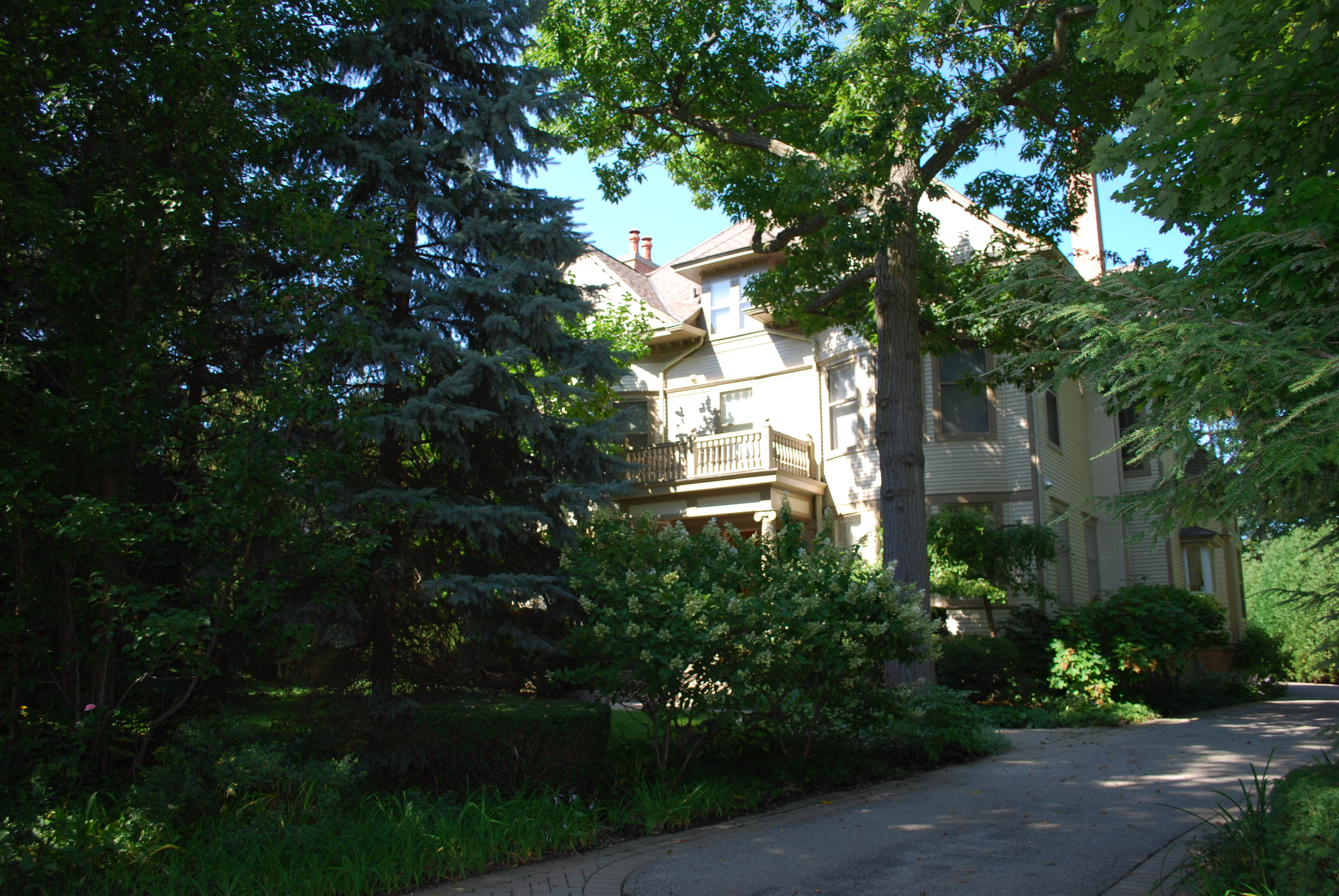

- Location within Chicago metropolitan area Location within Illinois Location within the United States
- Location: 1499 Sheridan Rd., Highland Park, Illinois
- Coordinates: 42.17999°N 87.79027°W
- Area: 0.8 acres (0.32 ha)
- Built: 1893; 133 years ago
- Architectural style: Queen Anne, Classical Revival
- MPS: Highland Park MRA
- NRHP reference No.: 82002554
- Added to NRHP: September 29, 1982

The Ross Beatty House is a historic house at 1499 Sheridan Road in Highland Park, Illinois. Built in 1893, the house is the first of two homes built for steel magnate Ross J. Beatty in Highland Park. The house was primarily designed in the Queen Anne style, but it also incorporates elements of Classical Revival architecture. The house's Queen Anne influence is mainly present in its massing and complex roof structure with multiple dormers. Its Classical Revival influence can be seen in its decorative elements, including many pedimented windows and sidelights flanking the entrance.

The house was added to the National Register of Historic Places on September 29, 1982. Beatty's other home in Highland Park, the Ross J. Beatty House, is also on the National Register.

It remains privately owned as of 2025.
