= Evert House =

Historic house in Illinois, United States

- U.S. National Register of Historic Places
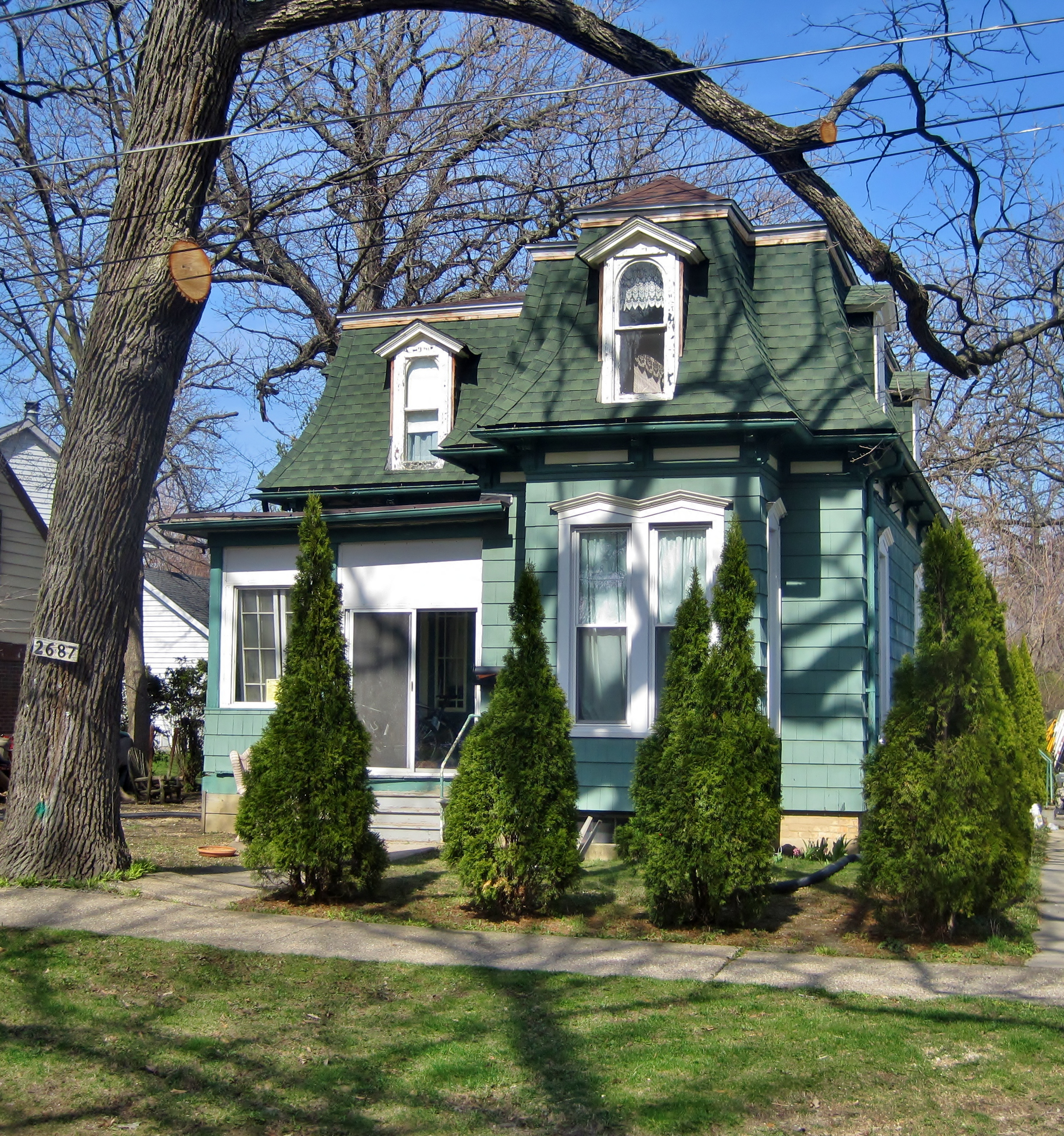

- Location within Chicago metropolitan area Location within Illinois Location within the United States
- Location: 2687 Logan St., Highland Park, Illinois
- Coordinates: 42°12′06″N 87°48′20″W
- Area: 0.3 acres (0.12 ha)
- Built: 1872
- Built by: Highland Park Building Co.
- Architectural style: Second Empire
- MPS: Highland Park MRA
- NRHP reference No.: 82002559
- Added to NRHP: September 29, 1982

The Evert House is a historic house at 2687 Logan Street in Highland Park, Illinois. The Highland Park Building Company built the house for Rev. W. W. Evert in 1872. The company, which built houses that buyers chose from pattern books, was responsible for many of Highland Park's early homes and community buildings. The house has a Second Empire design, a relatively uncommon style in the city. It features a mansard roof with two dormers and bracketed eaves.

The house was added to the National Register of Historic Places on September 29, 1982.
