= Grigsby Estate =

- U.S. National Register of Historic Places
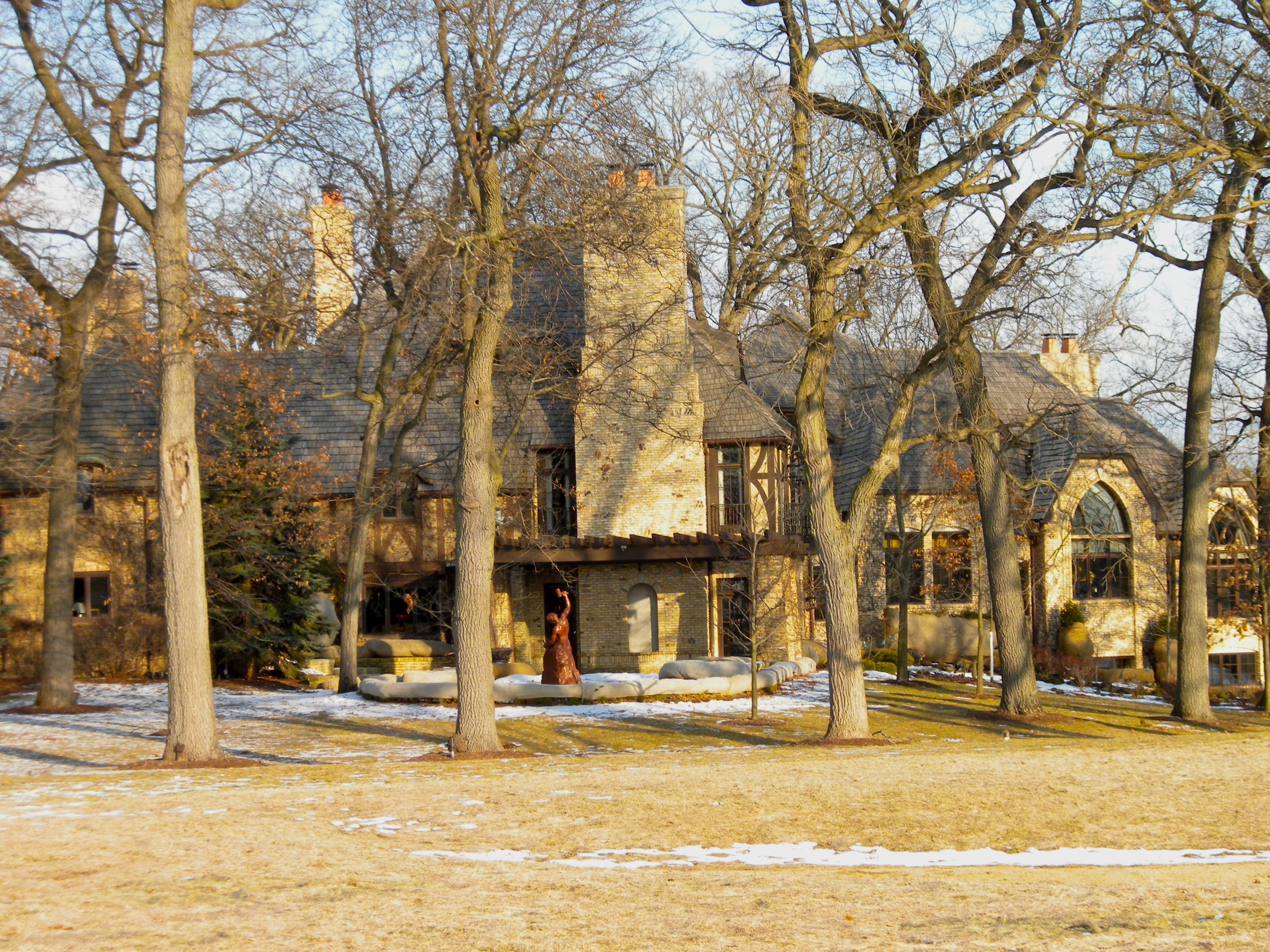

- Location within Chicago metropolitan area Location within Illinois Location within the United States
- Location: 125 Buckley Rd., Barrington Hills, Illinois
- Coordinates: 42°10′20″N 88°10′43″W
- Area: 112 acres (45 ha)
- Built: 1930
- Architect: Rowe, Dillard & Rowe
- Architectural style: Tudor Revival
- NRHP reference No.: 87000649
- Added to NRHP: May 12, 1987

The Grigsby Estate is a historic estate and hobby farm at 125 Buckley Road in Barrington Hills, Illinois, USA. The house was built in 1930 for Bertram James Grigsby, an electrical engineer and president of a radio manufacturing company, and his wife Elsie. The architectural firm of Rowe, Dillard and Rowe designed the estate's Tudor Revival manor house for the couple, a style which reflected their time in England; Elsie was born there, while Bertram worked there for several years. The house's design features an asymmetrical form, half-timbering, decorative brickwork and several brick chimneys. The estate also includes a guest house, a garage, a greenhouse, a farmhouse, a barn, a milkhouse, a firefighting shed and a machinery shed. The estate was typical of early development in the Barrington Hills area, which mainly consisted of estates and hobby farms that were often inspired by English country life.

The estate was added to the National Register of Historic Places on May 12, 1987.
