= Mrs. Frank Geyso Houses =

Historic houses in Illinois, United States

- U.S. National Register of Historic Places
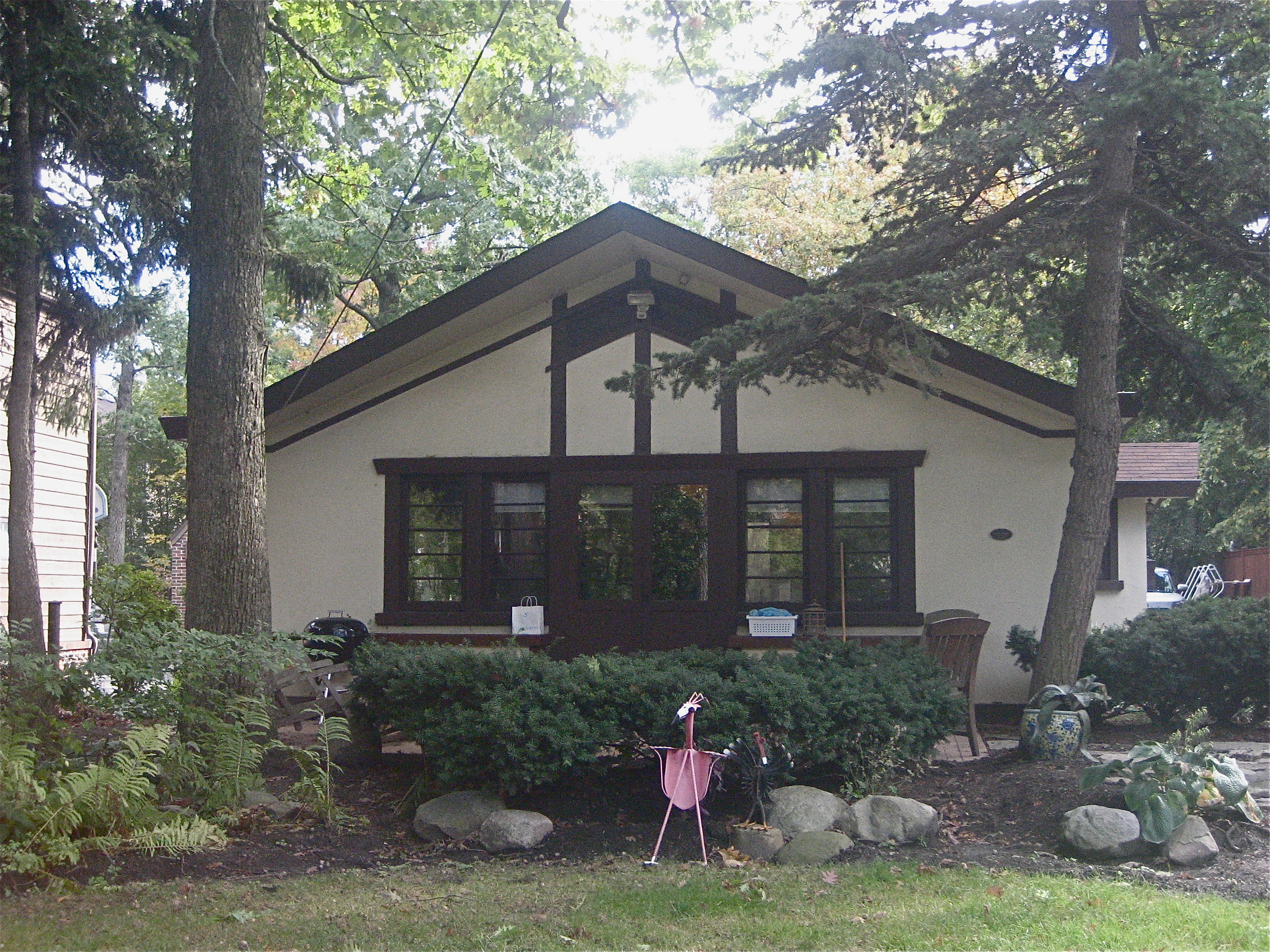
- 450 Woodland Road

- Location within Chicago metropolitan area Location within Illinois Location within the United States
- Location: 450 and 456 Woodland Rd., Highland Park, Illinois
- Coordinates: 42°09′41″N 87°46′39″W
- Area: 1 acre (0.40 ha)
- Built: 1923-25, 1930
- Architect: John S. Van Bergen
- Architectural style: Prairie School
- MPS: Highland Park MRA
- NRHP reference No.: 82002561
- Added to NRHP: September 29, 1982

The Mrs. Frank Geyso Houses are two neighboring houses at 450 and 456 Woodland Road in Highland Park, Illinois. The earlier house at 450 Woodland was built in 1923–1925, while the later house was built in 1930. John S. Van Bergen, a prominent Chicago architect who designed several other homes in Highland Park, designed both houses in the Prairie School style. The house at 450 Woodland is a cottage-style building with a stucco exterior and wood detail work. The house at 456 Woodland is a brick building with an entrance pavilion, a balcony, and overhanging eaves.

The houses were added to the National Register of Historic Places on September 29, 1982.
