= Lichtstern House =

Historic house in Illinois, United States

- U.S. National Register of Historic Places
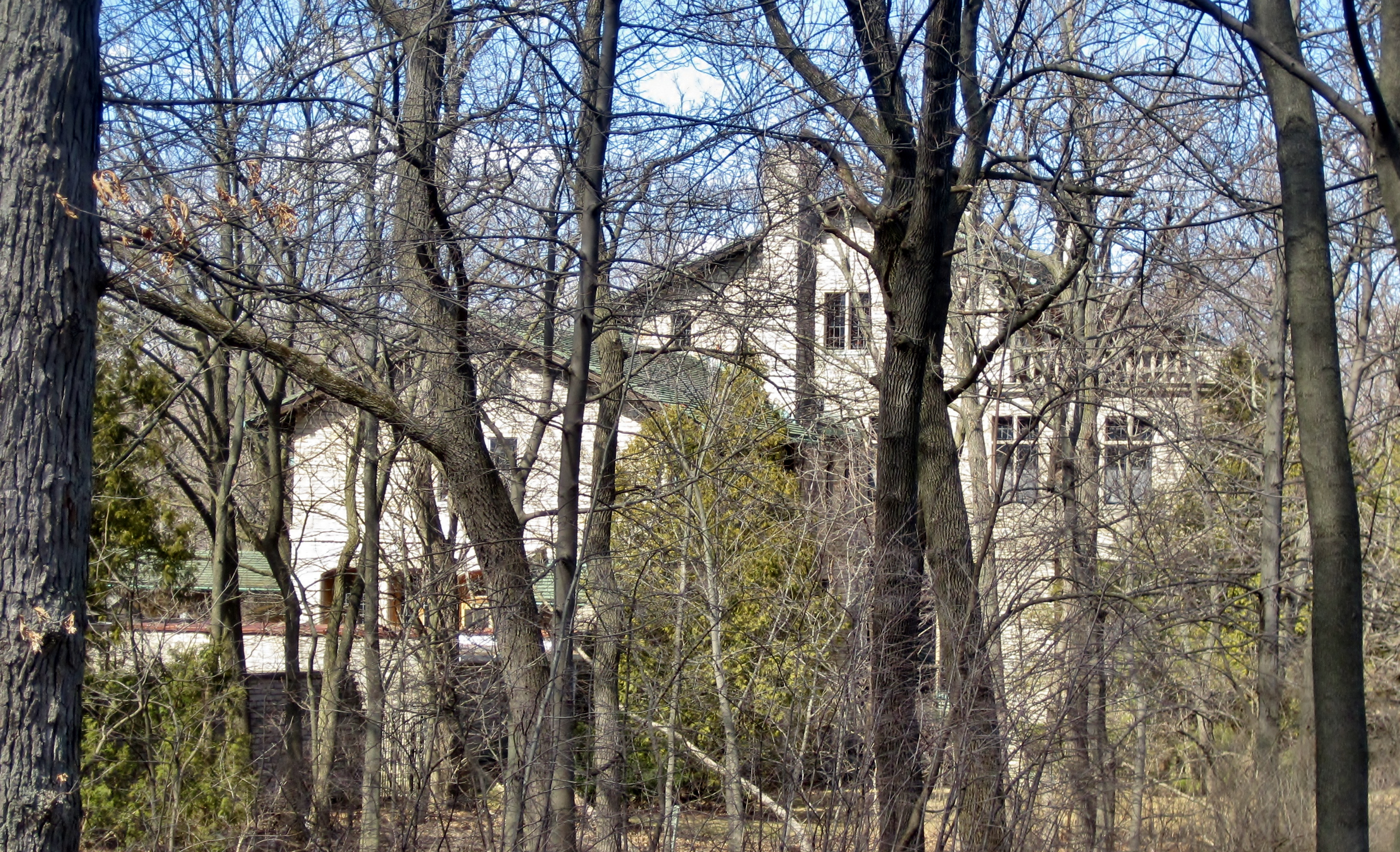

- Location within Chicago metropolitan area Location within Illinois Location within the United States
- Location: 105 S. Deere Park Dr., Highland Park, Illinois
- Coordinates: 42°09′17″N 87°45′46″W
- Area: 2.3 acres (0.93 ha)
- Built: 1919
- Architect: Arthur Heun
- Architectural style: Italian Villa
- MPS: Highland Park MRA
- NRHP reference No.: 82002569
- Added to NRHP: September 29, 1982

The Lichtstern House is a historic house at 105 S. Deere Park Drive in Highland Park, Illinois. The house was built in 1919 for a businessman named E. Lichtstern. Arthur Heun, a Chicago architect known for designing homes for the upper class, designed the house. Heun's design primarily used Italian Villa architecture, which was inspired by Lichtstern's travels to Italy, but also includes some Prairie School elements. Its overall form, use of segmental arches, and balconies are typical of the Italian Villa style, but its leaded glass windows and overhanging eaves are Prairie School features.

The house was added to the National Register of Historic Places on September 29, 1982.
