= Linden Park Place-Belle Avenue Historic District =

Historic district in Illinois, United States

- U.S. National Register of Historic Places
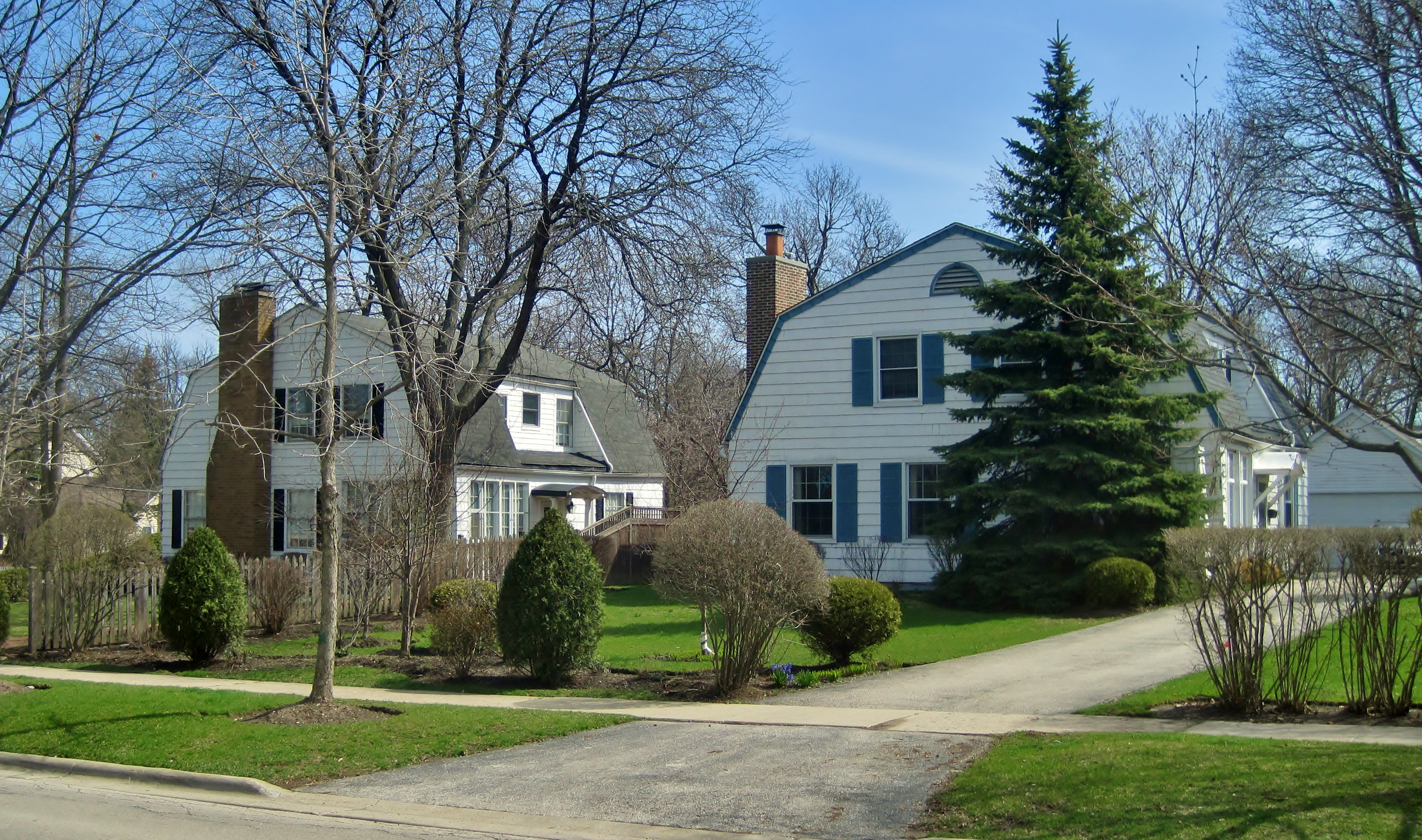

- Location within Chicago metropolitan area Location within Illinois Location within the United States
- Location: Roughly bounded by Sheridan Rd., Elm Pl., Linden, Park, and Central Aves., Highland Park, Illinois
- Coordinates: 42°11′16″N 87°47′38″W
- Area: 50 acres (20 ha)
- MPS: Highland Park MRA
- NRHP reference No.: 83003580
- Added to NRHP: December 13, 1983

The Linden Park Place-Belle Avenue Historic District is a residential historic district located in Highland Park, Illinois. The district includes 34 houses situated along Linden Park Place, Park Avenue, Linden Avenue, Elm Place, Park Lane, and Belle Avenue. The area is notable for its architectural significance, featuring designs by prominent architects such as George W. Maher and Robert Seyfarth.

The district also includes several homes built from pattern books during Highland Park's initial development phase in the 1870s. The architectural styles represented in the district are diverse, including Victorian Gothic, Italianate, and Prairie School.

The Linden Park Place-Belle Avenue Historic District was added to the National Register of Historic Places on December 13, 1983.
