= Hazel Avenue/Prospect Avenue Historic District =

Historic district in Illinois, United States

- Hazel Avenue Prospect Avenue Historic District
- U.S. National Register of Historic Places
- U.S. Historic district
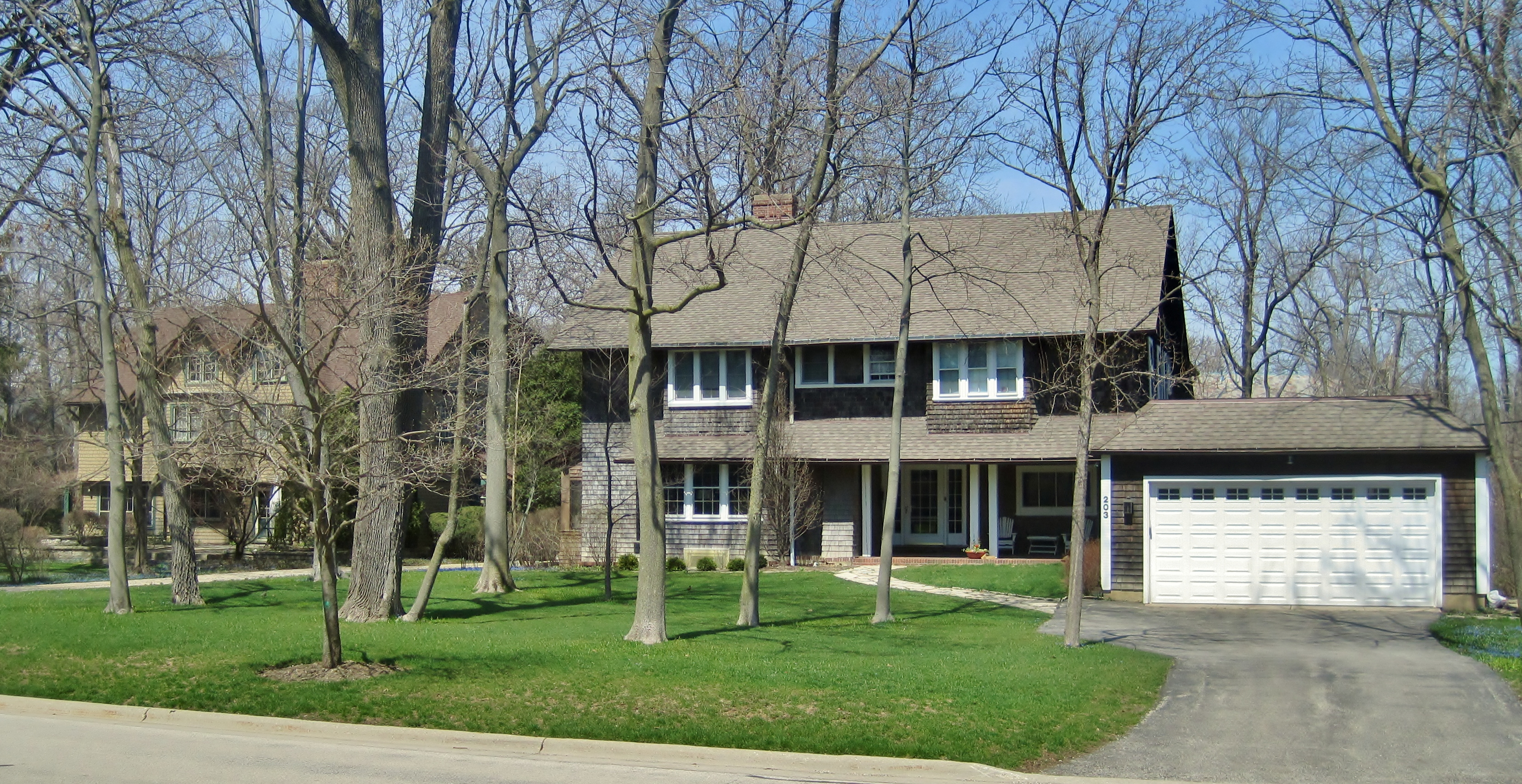
- Two houses in the district

- Location within Illinois Location within the United States
- Location: St. Johns, Hazel, Dale, Forest, and Prospect Aves., Highland Park, Illinois
- Coordinates: 42.18425°N 87.79103°W
- Area: 50 acres (20 ha)
- Built: 1870
- Architect: Multiple
- Architectural style: Late 19th And 20th Century Revivals, Late Victorian
- MPS: Highland Park MRA
- NRHP reference No.: 82002563
- Added to NRHP: September 29, 1982

The Hazel Avenue/Prospect Avenue Historic District is a historic area of Highland Park, Illinois, United States. It was home to some of Highland Park's most notable residents, including telephone inventor Elisha Gray.

== History ==
The historic district in Highland Park, Illinois reflects the period in the early 20th century when the town was recognized as a resort community. Included in the district is the Wildwood complex, a set of four summer houses on Hazel Avenue near Linden Avenue that shared a common dining room. Year-round residences were also constructed in the district at the time, some from notable architects. Howard Van Doren Shaw designed a Colonial Revival dwelling at 289 Prospect. Oral tradition also associates Shaw with the houses at 178 Prospect, 203 Prospect, and 215 Prospect. The district was recognized by the National Park Service with a listing on the National Register of Historic Places on September 29, 1982.

=== Buildings ===
The district was home to Elisha Gray, who is known for filing a patent for a telephone on the same day as Alexander Graham Bell. Gray's telephone was invented in 1874 in a small cottage at 333 Hazel Avenue. He lived in a house at 461 Hazel. William D. Mann designed a house for Elias Watkins at 239 Hazel. The house was later home to Edith Neisser, an author on child-rearing. Henry C. Lytton, chairman of Lytton's Department Store, commissioned a southern-style house at 276 Hazel. One of the four houses of Wilwood was owned by Oscar Foreman, who commissioned Jens Jensen to landscape the yard. A cabin that Jensen designed for the property was later moved and became part of the Heller Nature Center elsewhere in Highland Park.

Highland Park City Hall and the Highland Park Public Library are also found in the district. An 1847 log cabin originally owned by Franz Stuppi, is now park of a public museum. The lone church in the district is the First Church of Christian Science, built in 1941.
