= Karcher Hotel =

- U.S. National Register of Historic Places
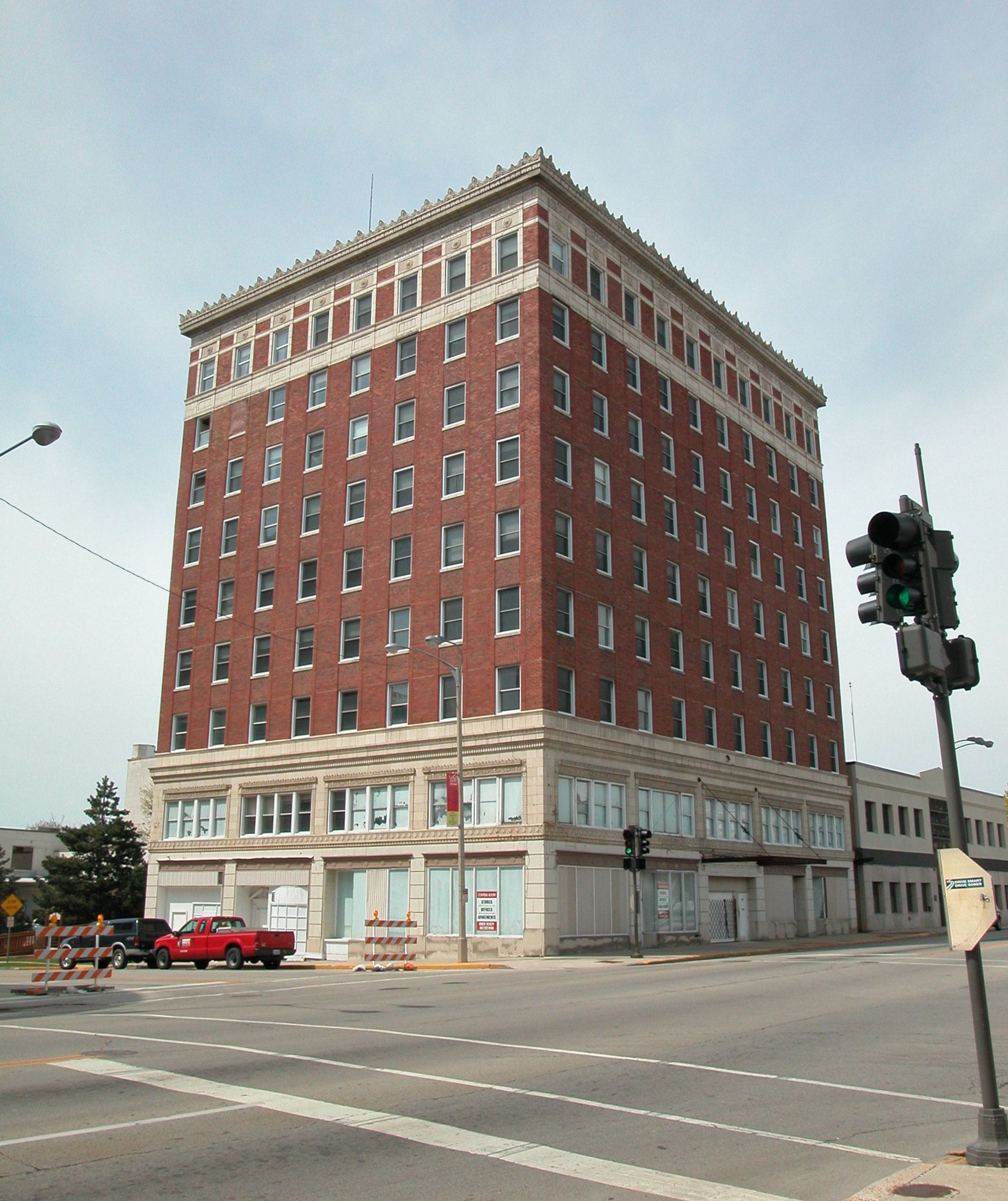

- Location within Illinois Location within the United States
- Location: 405 Washington St., Waukegan, Illinois
- Coordinates: 42°21′34″N 87°50′03″W
- Area: less than one acre
- Built: 1928
- Architect: B.K. Gibson
- Architectural style: Classical Revival
- NRHP reference No.: 02000845
- Added to NRHP: August 9, 2002

The Karcher Hotel is a historic hotel building at 405 Washington Street in Waukegan, Illinois. Opened in 1928, the hotel was built during an economic boom in Waukegan; its location near Waukegan's train station and downtown businesses was chosen to attract traveling businesspeople. In addition to renting rooms, the hotel housed commercial and office spaces on its first two floors. Architect B.K. Gibson of Chicago designed the hotel in the Classical Revival style; his design used the tripartite form common to Classical Revival skyscrapers, which included a two-story terra cotta base, a brick shaft, and an upper floor demarcated by terra cotta panels. Other classically inspired elements in the building include its terra cotta frieze, cornice, and parapet along with egg-and-dart and dentil detailing. While the hotel prospered during the Great Depression, it began to suffer economically in the 1960s and would ultimately close in 1981.

The building was added to the National Register of Historic Places on August 9, 2002.
