= Humer Building =

- U.S. National Register of Historic Places
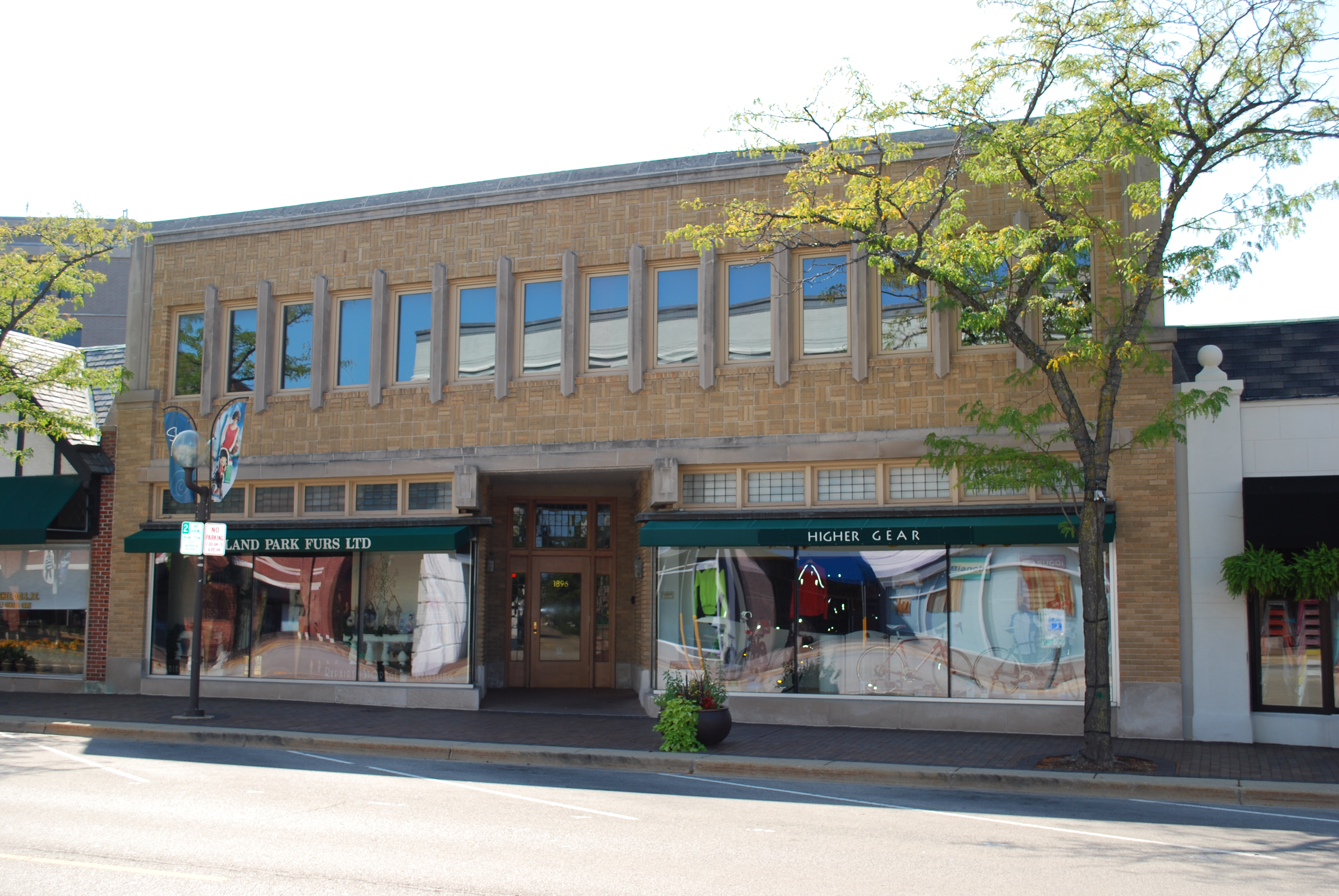

- Location within Chicago metropolitan area Location within Illinois Location within the United States
- Location: 1894 Sheridan Rd., Highland Park, Illinois
- Coordinates: 42°11′13″N 87°47′53″W
- Built: 1926
- Architect: John S. Van Bergen
- Architectural style: Prairie School
- MPS: Highland Park MRA
- NRHP reference No.: 82002566
- Added to NRHP: September 29, 1982

The Humer Building is a historic commercial building at 1894 Sheridan Road in Highland Park, Illinois. Built in 1926, the building houses two retail spaces on its first floor and office space on its second floor. Architect John S. Van Bergen, a former employee of Frank Lloyd Wright, designed the Prairie School building. While Van Bergen designed many homes in the same style, it was not commonly used in commercial buildings, and the Humer Building's design is unique among commercial buildings in Chicago's northern suburbs. The building features ribbon windows, geometric designs on the inside, and patterned glass on its staircase, all typical Prairie School elements.

The building was added to the National Register of Historic Places on September 29, 1982.
