= Haerman Lanzl House =

Historic house in Illinois, United States

- U.S. National Register of Historic Places
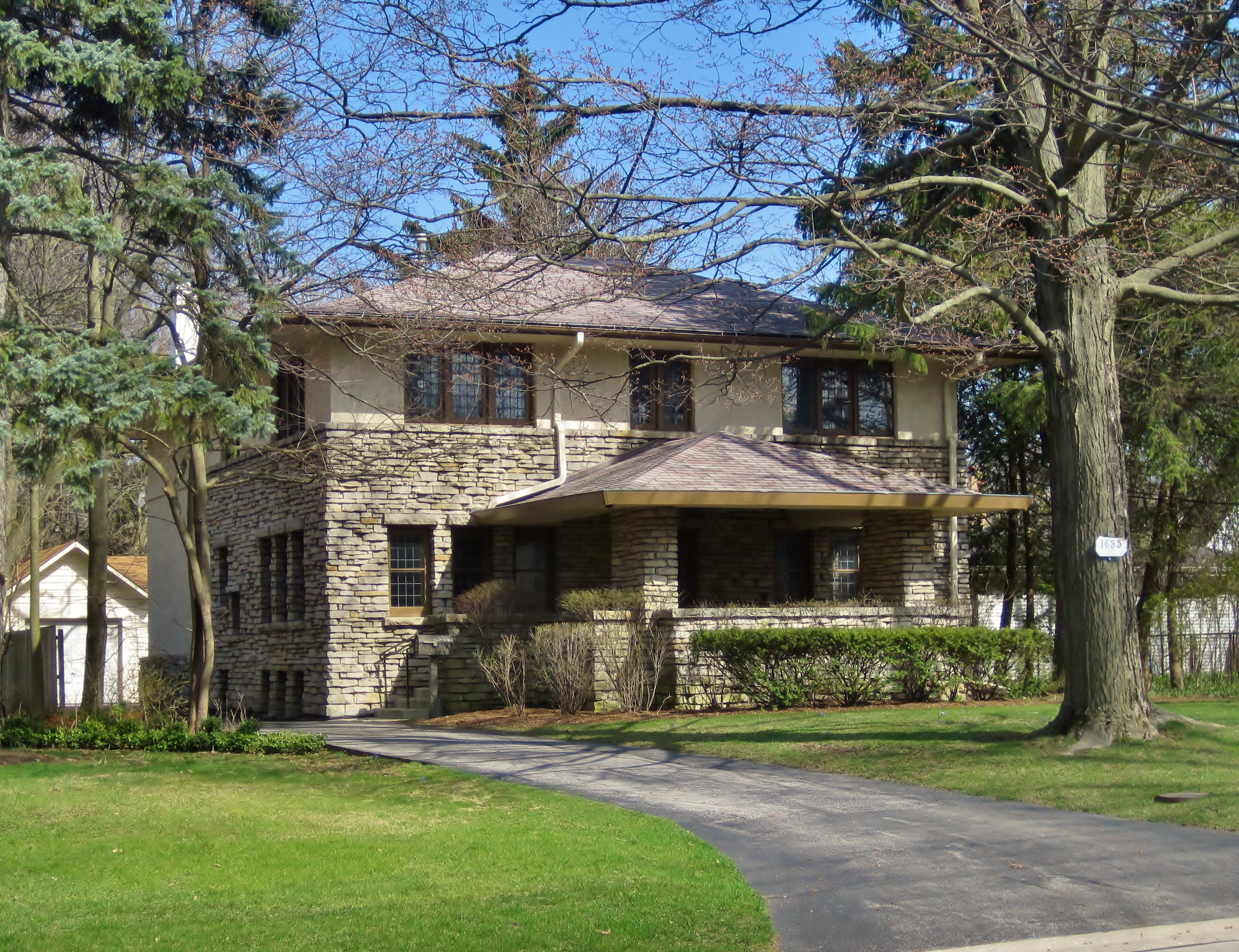

- Location within Chicago metropolitan area Location within Illinois Location within the United States
- Location: 1635 Linden Ave., Highland Park, Illinois
- Coordinates: 42°10′56″N 87°47′34″W
- Area: 0.5 acres (0.20 ha)
- Built: 1921
- Architect: John S. Van Bergen
- Architectural style: Prairie School
- MPS: Highland Park MRA
- NRHP reference No.: 82002568
- Added to NRHP: September 29, 1982

The Haerman Lanzl House is a historic house at 1635 Linden Avenue in Highland Park, Illinois. The Prairie School house was built in 1921. Architect John S. Van Bergen, a former employee of Frank Lloyd Wright, designed the home. While Van Bergen had previously designed Prairie School houses in Chicago's western suburbs, the Lanzl House was the first of many Prairie School homes he designed in Highland Park. The house was also Van Bergen's first design to use stratified limestone on its exterior.

The house was added to the National Register of Historic Places on September 29, 1982.
