= Howard and Lucy Linn House =

Historic house in Illinois, United States

- U.S. National Register of Historic Places
- Location within Chicago metropolitan area Location within Illinois Location within the United States
- Location: 555 Shoreacres Dr., Lake Bluff, Illinois
- Coordinates: 42°17′55″N 87°50′04″W
- Area: 4.7 acres (1.9 ha)
- Built: 1927
- Architect: Walter S. Frazier
- Architectural style: French Renaissance Revival
- NRHP reference No.: 05001257
- Added to NRHP: November 15, 2005

The Howard and Lucy Linn House is a historic house at 555 Shoreacres Drive in Lake Bluff, Illinois. The house was built in 1927 for Lucy Linn, the founder or president of multiple Chicago social organizations and a member of the prominent McCormick family, and her husband Howard, a businessman and aviator. The couple was typical of the wealthy, socially prominent people who built estates in Lake Bluff and neighboring Lake Forest. Architect Walter S. Frazier of the firm Frazier & Raftery designed the house in the French Renaissance Revival style, a choice inspired by Howard's service in France in World War I. The house has an asymmetrical plan with a stucco exterior, a loggia at the front entrance, a central courtyard, and several porches.

The house was added to the National Register of Historic Places on November 15, 2005.
