= Deerpath Inn =

- Deer Path Inn
- U.S. National Register of Historic Places
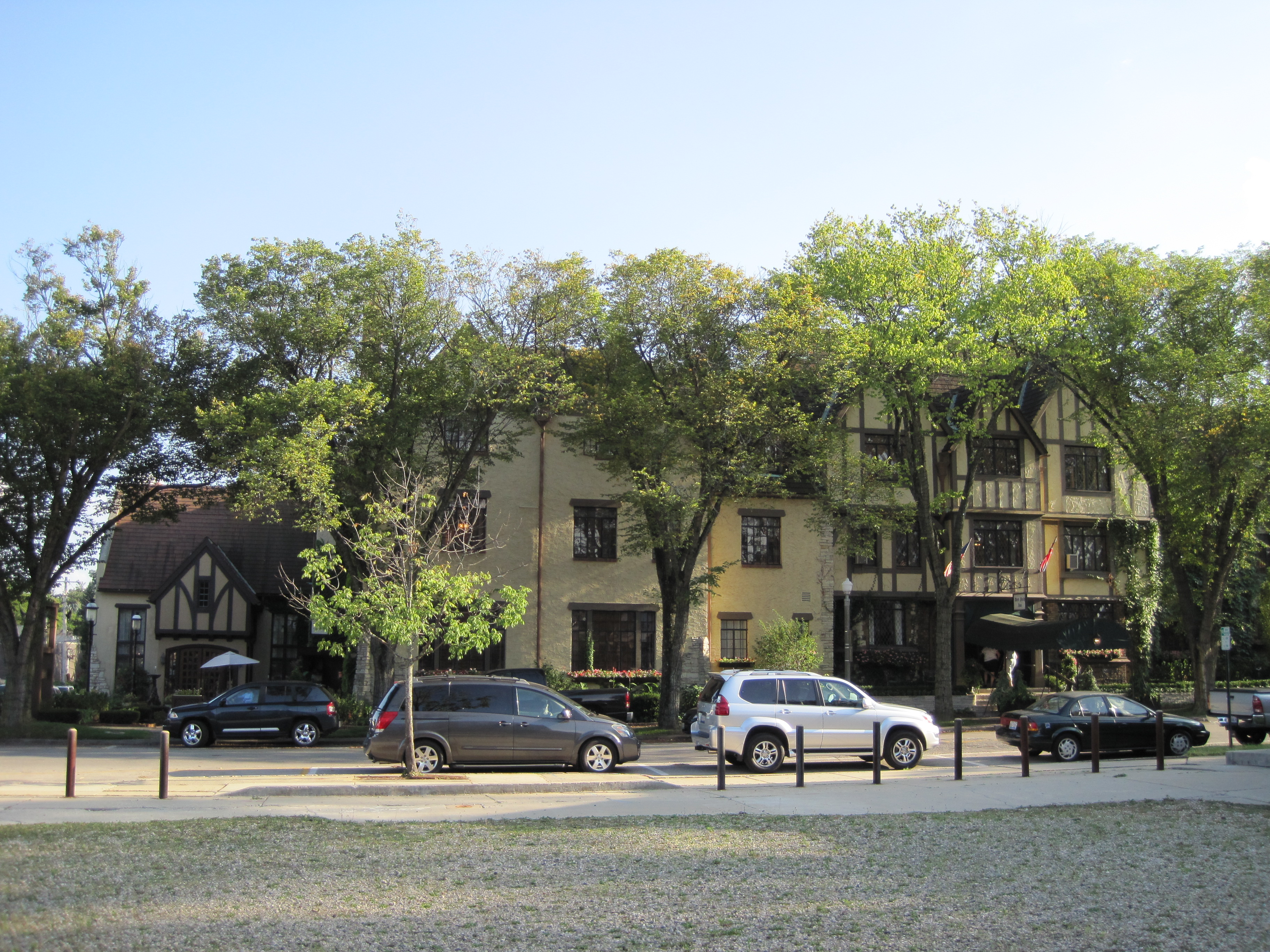

- Location within Illinois Location within the United States
- Location: 255 E. Illinois Rd., Lake Forest, Illinois
- Coordinates: 42°14′59″N 87°50′27″W
- Area: 3 acres (1.2 ha)
- Built: 1928–29
- Architect: Jones, William C.; Anderson & Ticknor
- Architectural style: Tudor Revival
- NRHP reference No.: 92000482
- Added to NRHP: May 11, 1992

The Deer Path Inn is a historic hotel. Originally named Deerpath Inn because of its previous location on Deerpath Road, it is now located at 255 E. Illinois Road in Lake Forest, Illinois.

== History ==
The oldest inn in Lake Forest which is still in operation today as The Deer Path Inn, was established in 1894 in a residence for Col. William Sage Johnston. Shortly afterward, the house was moved one block to the north to make way for the Gorton School. It came under ownership of Kate Lancaster Brewer, who first operated it as a hotel and gave it its present name. A new building was completed in 1903 at the corner of Deerpath and McKinley Roads, since demolished. Its current building was constructed in 1928–29 by then-owner Edwin Burgess on Illinois Avenue. Architect William C. Jones designed the hotel in the Tudor Revival style; his plan was inspired by a 15th-century manor house in Chiddingstone, England. A fire in 1938 damaged the building and required extensive repairs to the third story; the renovation work was conducted by architects Anderson and Ticknor.

The hotel functioned as an apartment hotel and served as a permanent home for many wealthy Lake Forest residents, particularly older ones who were unable to maintain private homes. The hotel's single front door and interior spaces were designed to resemble a large home or club rather than a multi-resident complex, separating it from many other apartment hotels of the era. While apartment hotels were common in Chicago and Evanston, The Deer Path Inn was the only apartment hotel of its type in the other communities of the North Shore. The hotel still operates as a resort and wedding venue.

The hotel was added to the National Register of Historic Places on May 11, 1992.
