= Public Service Building (Libertyville, Illinois) =

- U.S. National Register of Historic Places
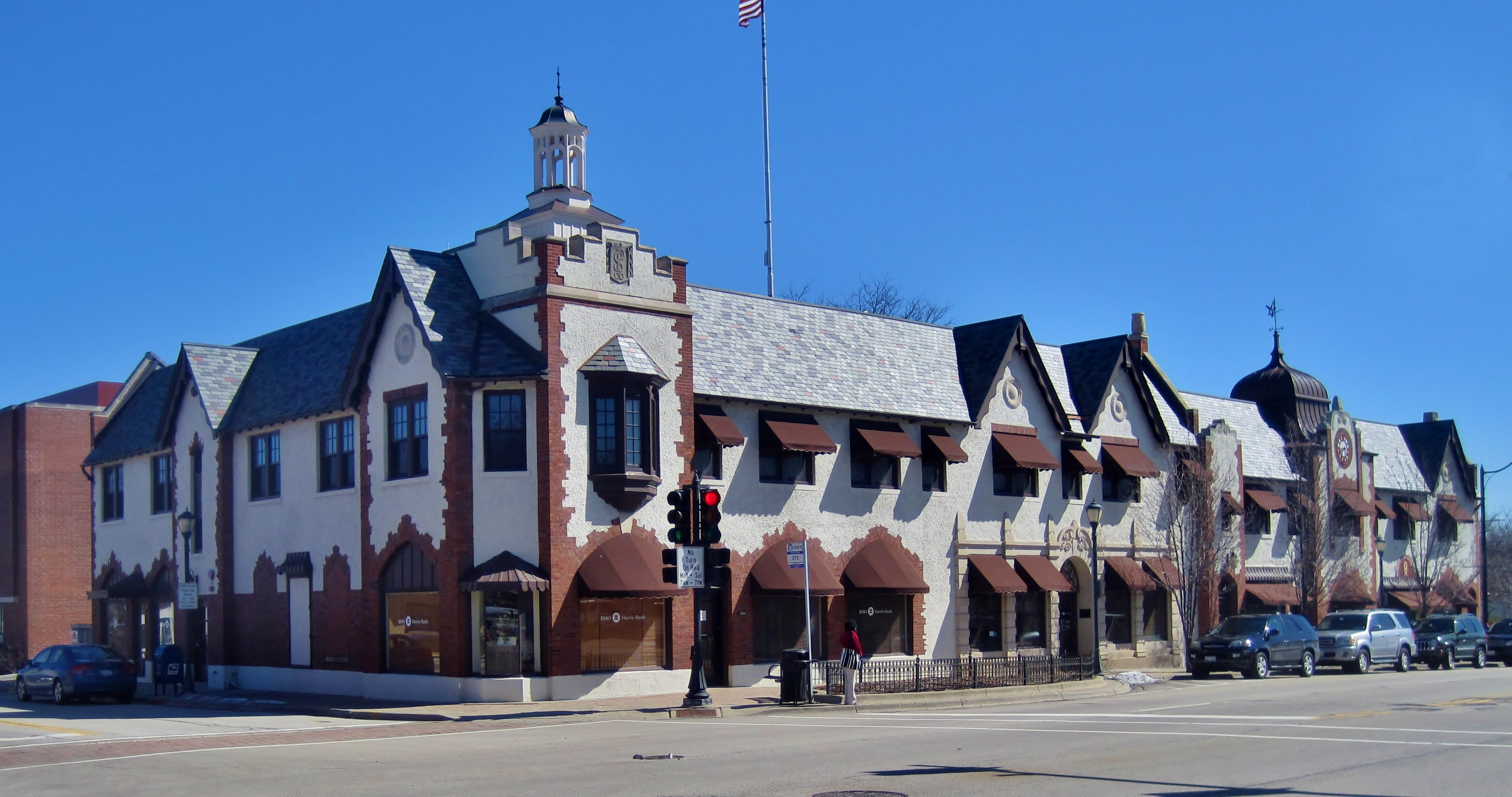

- Location within Chicago metropolitan area Location within Illinois Location within the United States
- Location: 344-354 N. Milwaukee Ave., Libertyville, Illinois
- Coordinates: 42°17′12″N 87°57′13″W
- Area: 1.1 acres (0.45 ha)
- Built: 1928
- Architect: Hermann Valentin von Holst
- Architectural style: Gothic Tudor Revival, Plateresque
- NRHP reference No.: 83003581
- Added to NRHP: December 8, 1983

The Public Service Building is a historic building at 344-354 N. Milwaukee Avenue in Libertyville, Illinois. The commercial block was built in 1928 for utility magnate Samuel Insull. Architect Hermann V. von Holst designed the building, which has an eclectic style mainly influenced by the Gothic Tudor Revival and Plateresque styles. It is listed on the National Register of Historic Places.

== History ==
Samuel Insull, a former associate of Thomas Edison who developed and controlled much of the Midwestern utilities market, commissioned the building in 1928. Insull had lived in Libertyville since 1907, and he owned the Libertyville Trust and Savings Bank along with many other banks throughout the Midwest. The two-story building included commercial space on its first floor and offices and apartments on its second. In addition to renting the space within it, Insull also intended for the building to highlight the power of electricity and, in turn, the importance of his work to expand it. The building's initial tenants included Insull's own bank, a Chevrolet dealership, clothing stores, and dentists and small companies in the office space.

Shortly after the building opened, the Great Depression bankrupted Insull, and he lost both his assets and his influence. Without an involved owner, the building fell into disrepair in the ensuing decades. A new owner renovated the building in the 1950s, resulting in both the bank's return to the building and new shops opening there. Another renovation took place in 1982, and the building was added to the National Register of Historic Places on December 8, 1983.

== Architecture ==
Chicagoan Hermann V. von Holst designed the Public Service Building. von Holst was known both for his work as an academic architect and for purchasing Frank Lloyd Wright's Chicago practice in 1909 when Wright moved to Europe. He had designed buildings for Insull and his utility companies for decades, but due to Insull's ensuing bankruptcy, the Public Service Building proved to be the last they would collaborate on.

von Holst's design for the building incorporates several architectural styles. The Gothic Tudor Revival style is most prominent throughout the building, but it also includes elements of Spanish and Indian architecture. As the building occupies a corner lot, it has two fronts, which are joined by a corner tower with a cupola. The stone facade of the bank's original space has a Plateresque design, a Spanish style which von Holst used to convey sturdiness. While the building initially included a central arcade, it was enclosed during its renovations; the arcade's west entrance, however, still stands, and it features a dome and a Seth Thomas clock.
