= Jens Jensen Summer House and Studio =

Historic house in Illinois, United States

- U.S. National Register of Historic Places
- U.S. Historic district
- Location within Illinois Location within the United States
- Location: 930-950 Dean Ave., Highland Park, Illinois
- Coordinates: 42.16941°N 87.77884°W
- Area: 3 acres (1.2 ha)
- Built by: Jensen, Jens
- Architectural style: Shingle Style
- MPS: Highland Park MRA
- NRHP reference No.: 91000795
- Added to NRHP: June 19, 1991

The Jens Jensen Summer House and Studio at 930-950 Dean Ave. in Highland Park, Illinois is associated with landscape architect Jens Jensen. It was listed on the National Register of Historic Places in 1991.

== History ==
Jens Jensen was a Danish immigrant who rose from a laborer for the West Park Commission in Chicago, Illinois to its general superintendent. He was serving in this role in 1908, when he decided to build a summer house in Highland Park. Jensen named the studio "The Clearing" and spent the next seven years designing it.

Upon its completion in 1915, Jensen gradually moved his operations from Chicago to his new Highland Park estate. By 1920, when he left the West Park Commission, Jensen had closed his Chicago office and was operating solely from Highland Park. It was on his estate grounds that Jensen first experimented with the "council ring"; this stone circle bench design would become one of Jensen's most enduring designs. Jensen's daughter and her husband, Marshall Johnson, moved there in 1920.

Jensen lived at his Highland Park until the early 1930s, when he moved to nearby Wilmette, Illinois. He maintained operations at the studio until 1934, when he established The Clearing in Ellison Bay, Wisconsin. Houses designed at the Highland Park estate include the Ernest Loeb House and the Harold Florsheim House. As his Chicago studio has since been demolished, the Highland Park house and studio remains as the office most closely associated with Jensen's career. The two buildings and the property were recognized by the National Park Service with a listing on the National Register of Historic Places on June 19, 1991.
