= Norbert Blei =

American writer

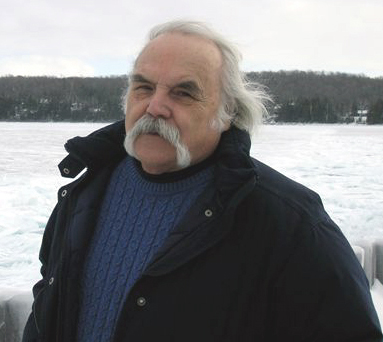
- Born: August 23, 1935; Chicago, Illinois
- Died: April 23, 2013 (aged 78); Sister Bay, Wisconsin
- Occupations: Essayist; novelist; poet; painter; journalist
- Writing career
- Notable works: Chi-Town, Neighborhood, Door Way, Door Steps, Meditations on a Small Lake
- Website: web.archive.org/web/20110714192703/http://norbertblei.com/code/home.asp (Archived July 14, 2011)

Norbert George Blei (August 23, 1935 – April 23, 2013) was an American writer of non-fiction, fiction, and poetry. In 1994, he established Cross+Roads Press, dedicated to the publication of first chapbooks by poets, short story writers, novelists and artists.

== Biography ==
Blei was born in an ethnic (primarily Czech-Slovak) neighborhood of western Chicago, Illinois known as Little Village. An only child, Blei and his parents moved to the near-western Chicago suburb of Cicero when he was in grade school.

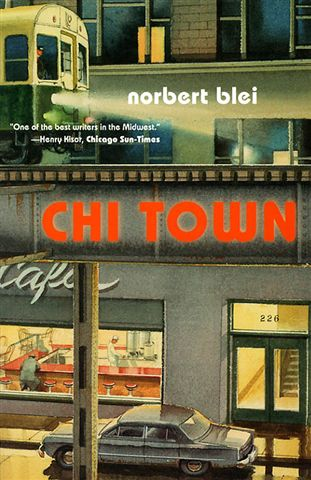
CHI TOWN (1990)

Blei attended Illinois State University, studying English, and graduated in 1956. He taught high school English and subsequently worked at the City News Bureau of Chicago as a reporter. In 1969, Blei left Chicago and moved to Door County, Wisconsin, a rural vacation destination for Midwesterners on the Door Peninsula in Lake Michigan. For four decades, he worked in a converted chicken coop in Ellison Bay, Wisconsin.

Blei's first book was The Hour of the Sunshine Now: Short Stories by Norbert Blei, published in 1978.

Blei was an early adopter of the Internet as a means to distribute his own work and call attention to other writers. His Poetry Dispatch was a weekly enewsletter that featured a short selection of poems by a single, noteworthy poet, while Notes from the Underground was an irregular email that featured brief essays on current topics, literary and otherwise.

== Literary themes ==
A sense of community and threats to community were the twin themes of Blei's writing, whether he is writing about urban Chicago or rural Wisconsin:

"Norb specializes in the fleeting look at the little people of the city, the aged newsstand operators, the small restaurant owners, Greek, Bohemian, Slovak, who still provide, in out-of-the-way neighborhoods, national dishes and national atmosphere. And he is determined to get these glimpses of a disappearing Chicago on paper before they are ploughed under to make way for new high-rise apartments, or succumb to the creeping wave of debris, human and material, so characteristic of most large cities these days." (Henry Shea, 1970)

"Thus a profound feeling of loss permeates all of Blei's work. Perhaps Blei's own sense of himself as an isolated, alienated writer—a consistent self-portrait, across geographies and through years of economic and literary success and failure, prominence and reduced visibility—derives from his sense of doomed place, or, more properly, doomed community in place. Whether author imposes his vision on place (others in Cicero and Door County have found more to cheer about over the past thirty years), or place imposes itself on author, the result is an author celebrating the forgotten, the beat and defeated: others and himself." (David Pichaske, 2000)

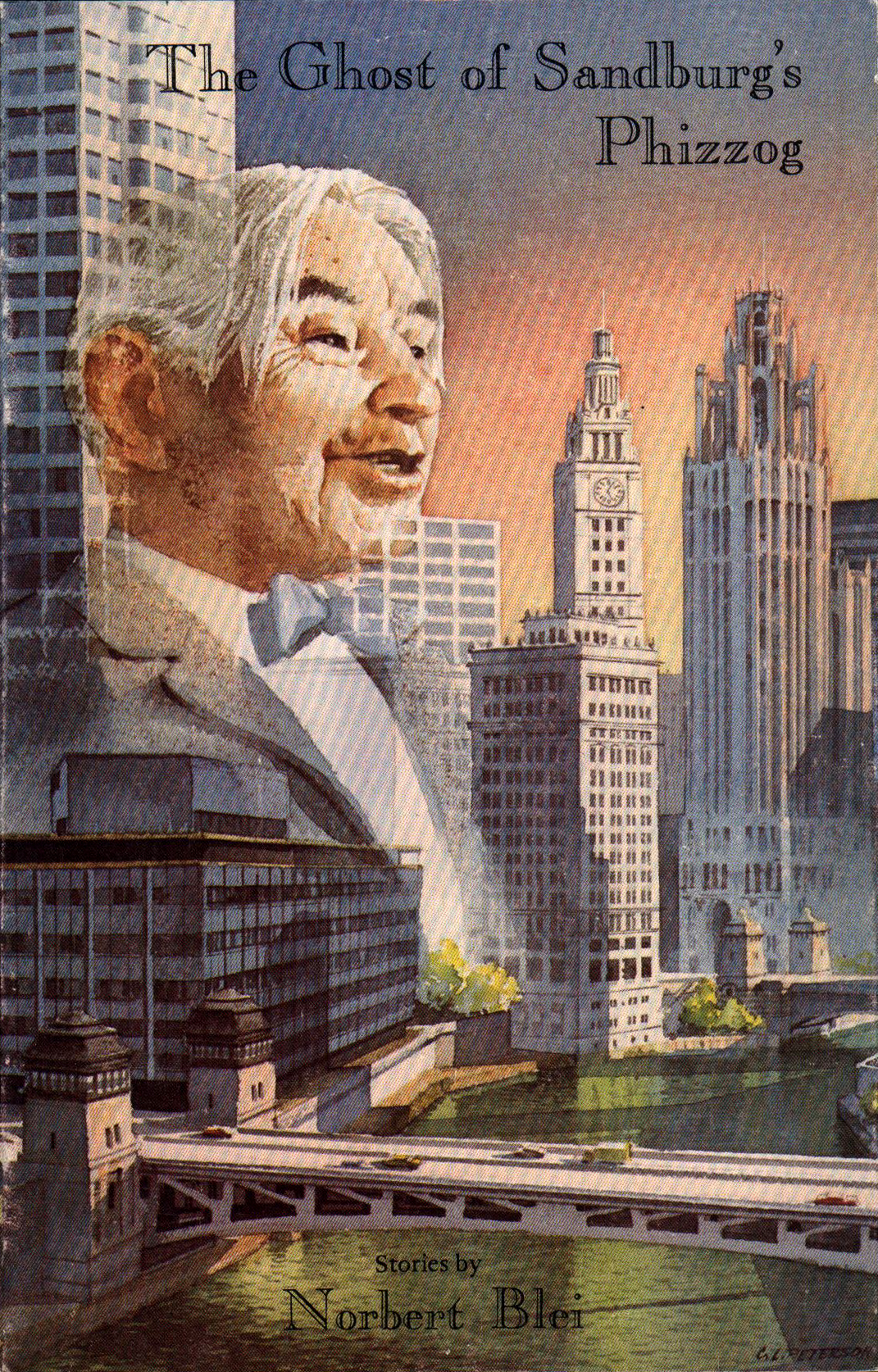
The Ghost of Sandburg's Phizzog (1986)

'The Elephants and Everybody Else' (Crossroads+Press)

== Cross+Roads Press ==
In the early 1990s, Blei started Cross+Roads Press to offer established and beginning writers an opportunity to be published in chapbook form. To date, works by almost 40 writers have been published.

== The Clearing ==
For over 30 years, Blei was writer-in-residence at The Clearing, a folk arts school founded in 1935 by landscape architect Jens Jensen. Blei's annual June writing classes drew developing writers from across the country. After 2007, Blei conducted his annual writing classes independently.

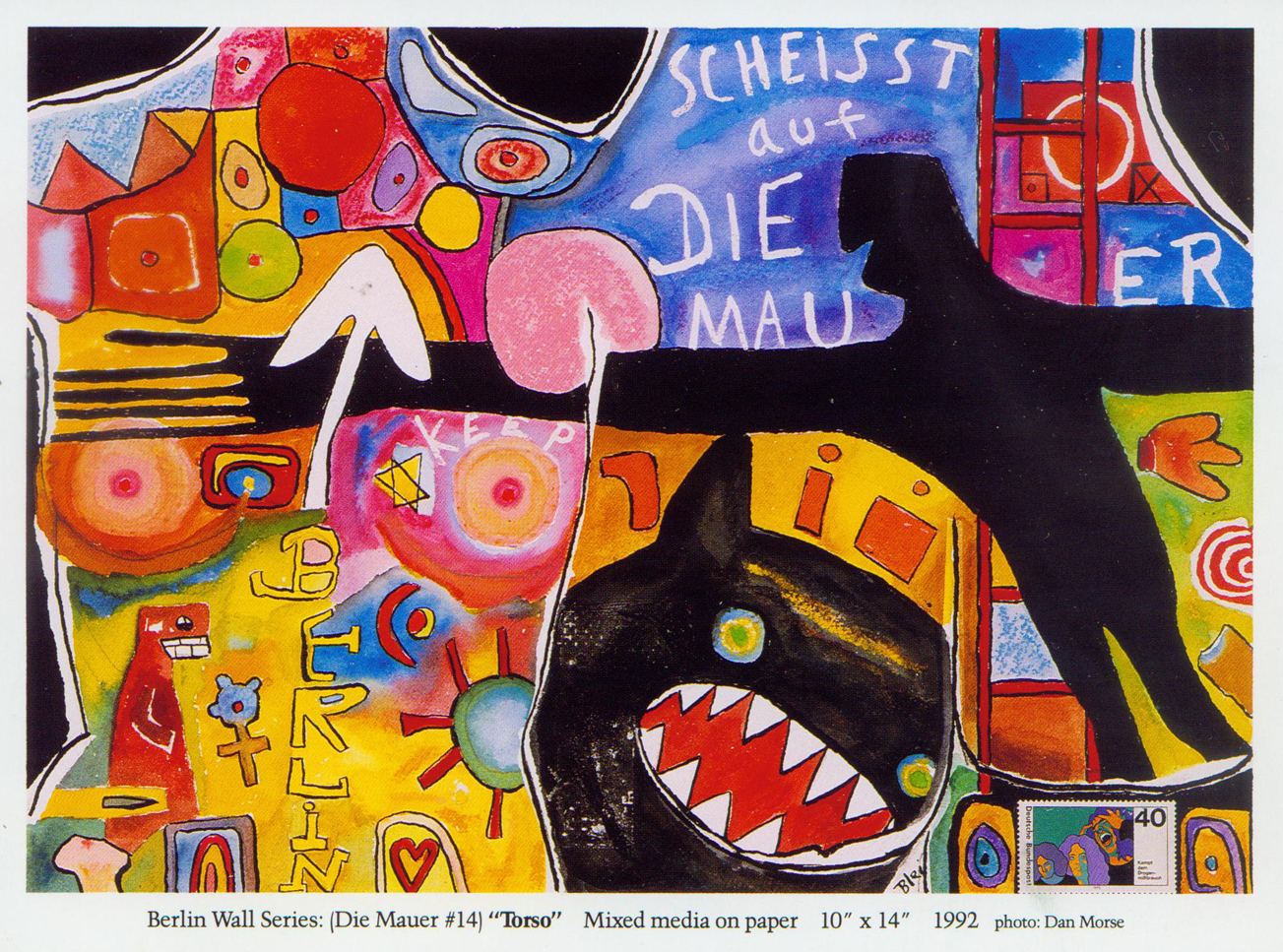
'Torso,' Berlin Wall Series

== Visual arts ==
Blei was a watercolor artist. Following a trip to Berlin in the then-West Germany in the early 1980s, he created a series of works based on the experience. The "Die Mauer" paintings focused on the Berlin Wall and were exhibited in Santa Fe and other locations.

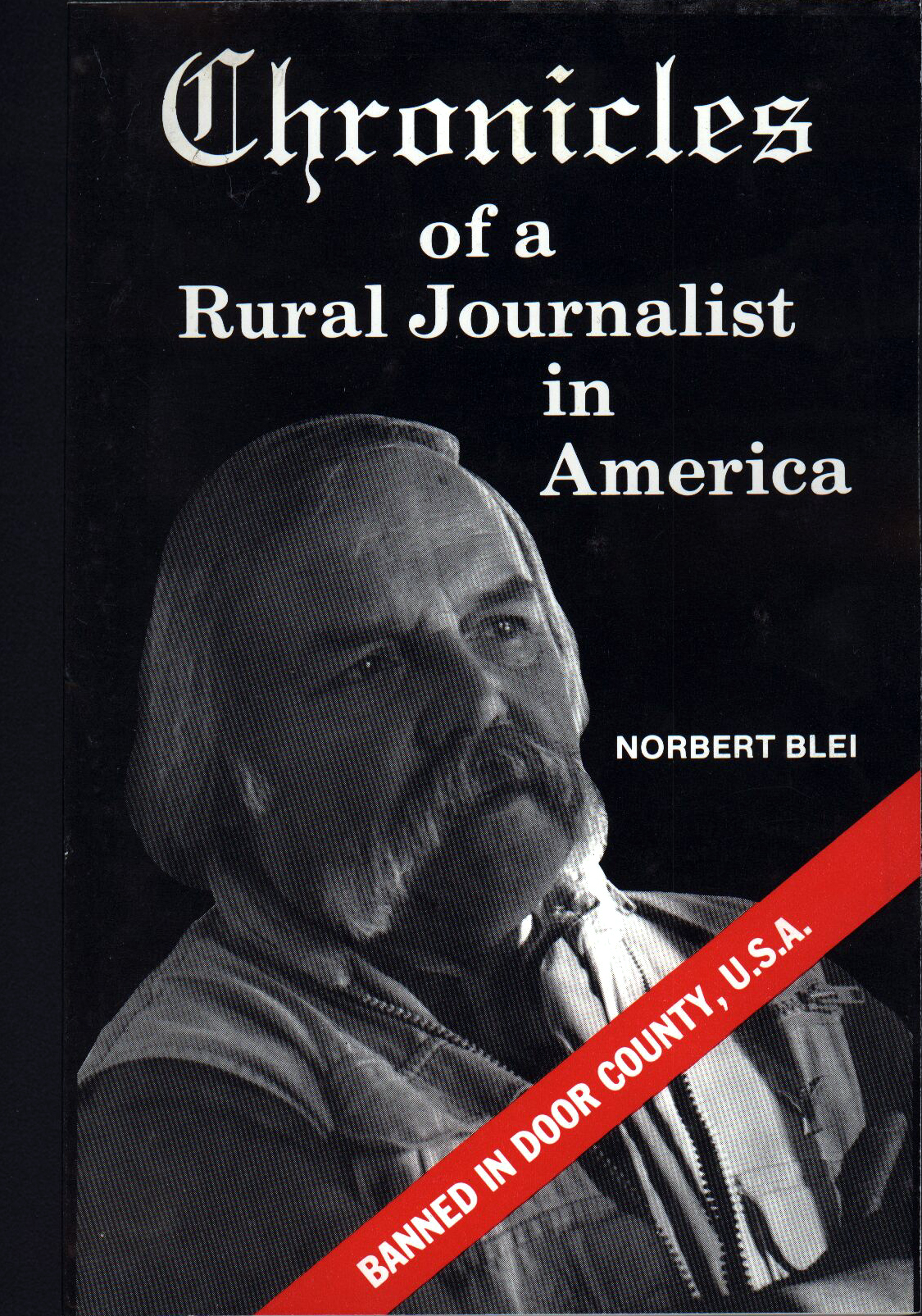
Chronicles of a Rural Journalist in America (1990)

== Writing projects ==
Blei collaborated with the pseudonymous Monsieur K, located in France, who created an assortment of web sites for posting writings artists judged to abide by the spirit of "free jazz". Blei regularly provided Monsieur K with commentary on significant artistic events for the Metropolis site, poetry and other material for the Basho's Road site, and artistic profiles and critiques for Poetry Dispatch & Other Notes from the Underground.

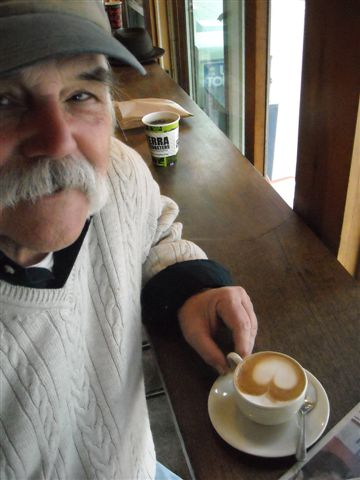
Alterra Coffeehouse, Downer Avenue, Milwaukee, Wis.

== Controversy ==
Blei fomented local controversy when he outlined a new vision for Door County, Wisconsin in an article in the area's weekly newspaper, The Door Reminder. Published in 1992, it was titled "Shut the Damn Door". The area's residents were sharply divided on the proposal, as recounted in an essay by Blei's publisher at Ellis Press, David Pichaske: "Blei outlined a Master Plan for the Future of Door County loosely based on the 'Industrial Tourism' chapter of Ed Abbey's Desert Solitaire. Blei suggests that county officials freeze all building, property sales, and residential, commercial and public planning in the County; turn the entire County over to Nature Conservancy; close the new bridge at Sturgeon Bay and make an outdoor walking mall of it, with artsy-craftsy shops, a Ferris wheel, and Chicago style food vendors; admit tourists freely across the old bridge May through October, subject to a tax of $50 per vehicle per week and $25 per person per day, but from November through April by visa only; tear up all highways and back roads and return them to their natural state of dirt, gravel, good Door County earth; place a moratorium on new road construction in the County; encourage vandalism of commercial signs while instituting a $3,000 fine for anyone caught erecting new advertisements or newspaper mail boxes; tear up 'ugly metal road signs' and either replace them with wooden ones or leave the roads nameless. 'Take any dirt road and get lost,' Blei concludes. 'You may discover the real value of this place. You may discover yourself.'"

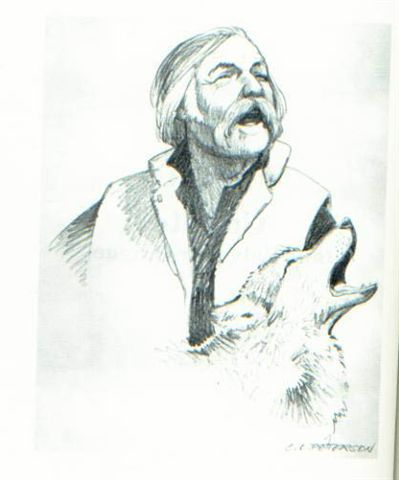
Blei, aka 'Coyote'; drawing by Chick Peterson

== Works ==
=== Novels ===
- The Second Novel: Becoming a Writer (1978)
- Adventures in an American's Literature (1982)

=== Story collections ===
- The Hour of the Sunshine Now: Short Stories by Norbert Blei (1978)
- The Ghost of Sandburg's Phizzog (1986)

=== Non-fiction ===
- Door Way: The People in the Landscape (1981)
- Door Steps (1983)
- Door to Door (1985)
- Neighborhood (1987)
- Meditations on a Small Lake (1987)
- Chi-Town (1990)
- Chronicles of a Rural Journalist in America (1990)
- Winter Book (2002)

=== Poetry ===
- Paint Me a Picture/Make Me a Poem (1987)

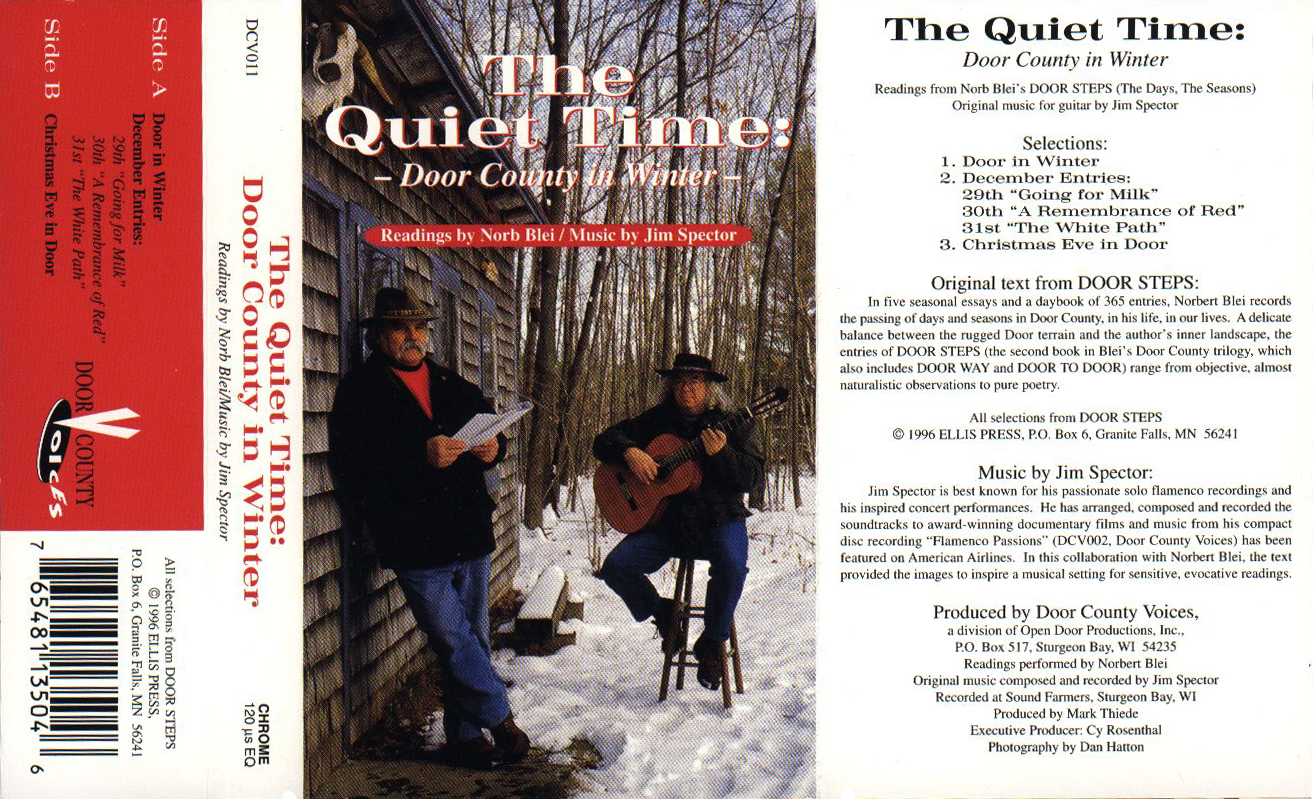
'The Quiet Time: Door County in Winter' (1997)

=== Collections and anthologies ===
- Wisconsin's Rustic Roads: A Road Less Travelled; Photographs by Bob Rashid, Text By Ben Logan, George Vukelich, Jean Feraca, Norbert Blei and Bill Stokes (1995)
- Rooted: Seven Midwest Writers of Place, by David Pichaske, University of Iowa Press (2006)
- Anthologies, selected list, (Archived August 3, 2011)

=== Recordings ===
- The Quiet Time, Door County in Winter: Readings by Norb Blei/Music by Jim Spector (1997)
- Readings from Door Way (1996)

=== Articles ===
- Henderson dark man of Door, Door County Advocate, September 13, 1977
- Bailey Harbor's Bird Carver, Door County Advocate, September 27, 1977
- With Gerhard Miller, painting had to come out, and it did, Door County Advocate, November 1, 1977
- Artist Miller heard sailors spin yarns on schooner decks, Door County Advocate, November 3, 1977
- Woodworker Anderson example of generation seeking its own way, Door County Advocate, March 7, 1978
- Kash: a potter's way in Door, Door County Advocate, July 20, 1978
- Hard driving restauranteur Al Johnson doesn't mince words, Door County Advocate, June 22, 1978
- 'They got to let the fishermen fish' Door County Advocate, October 18, 1977
- 'Teacher' Phil Sweet doesn't fall back on dogmatic answers, Door County Advocate, June 15, 1978
- 'Clean piece Wally,' the world's greatest car salesman, Door County Advocate, December 28, 1978
- Tom Collis--Socrates at Newport, January 26, 1978
- Break with agency, eye trouble steps in bring Austin to Door, Door County Advocate, March 23, 1978
- Phil Austin feels compelled to capture a passing beauty, Door County Advocate, March 28, 1978
- "It boils down to greed" by Norbert Blei, in Conversations on Door County by Dave Crehore, Wisconsin Natural Resources, May–June 1986, Volume 10, Number 3, Wisconsin Department of Natural Resources, page 16
