= Charles L. Peterson =

American artist (1927–2022)

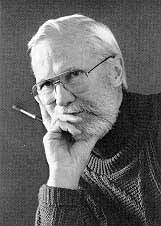
- Born: April 5, 1927; Elgin, Illinois, U.S.
- Died: June 2, 2022 (aged 95); Ephraim, Wisconsin, U.S.
- Education: American Academy of Art, Marietta College, Ohio University
- Occupation: Artist
- Spouse: Susan
- Writing career
- Subject: Fine art
- Notable works: Memories Collection; Maritime Collection; School Days; A Week in Door County
- Website: clpetersonstudio.com, archived October 22, 2020

Charles L. Peterson (April 5, 1927 – June 2, 2022), also known as Chick Peterson, was an American artist known for watercolor paintings and for maritime artwork. He was also known for painting ghosts that are not in watercolor, but were placed within otherwise watercolor paintings.

== Early life ==
Peterson was born on April 5, 1927 in Elgin, Illinois. Peterson graduated from Elgin High School in 1945 He then served in the U.S. Pacific Navy in the South Pacific, and then attended the American Academy of Art College in Chicago and Marietta College in Ohio.

== Career ==
After serving in the navy, Peterson was a professor at Concord University in West Virginia and also was a faculty member at Marietta College. He worked in the limited edition print industry.

After retiring from the limited edition print industry, Peterson continued to paint daily and designed work specifically for reproduction. He also worked on commission for private or corporate interests. Peterson died on June 2, 2022, at his home in Ephraim.

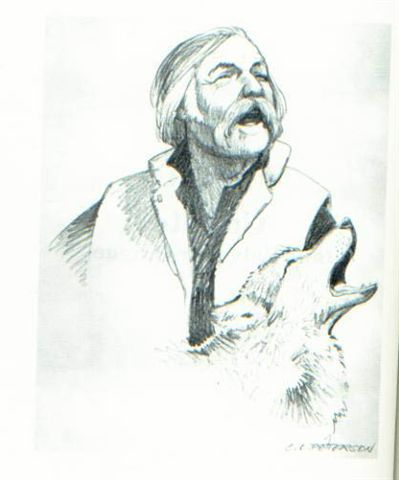
Drawing of Norbert Blei and a coyote by Peterson

After service in WWII in the U.S. Pacific Fleet, Charles graduated from Chicago's American Academy of Art, and earned a BA at the Marietta College of Ohio, and an MFA from Ohio University with a post masters study at the University of Wisconsin. He enjoyed a 20 year long career as a Professor and eventually became the Head of the Art Department at Marietta College, Ohio. Influenced by a lifelong interest in nature, and particularly the sea, he devoted his classically trained skills to genre painting, and painting the lives of ordinary people doing ordinary things, commonly in historic settings.

In 1973 Peterson moved his family to Ephraim, Wisconsin. As a full time painter, he soon established a national (and eventually international) reputation, initially through Illustrations for Wooden Boat, Cruising World, Sail and other nautical magazines. He also became known through international competition, being listed among the "Modern Marine Masters" by The Maritime Gallery at Mystic Seaport Museum where he had won several prizes, the most recent being the Museum Purchase Award in 2006.

He also enjoyed a parallel career in the signed, limited edition print field, producing over 130 pieces since 1979. From 1992 onward, associated with the White Door Publishing Company, he was listed by the U.S. Art Magazine as being among The Top Ten Most Popular in the nation's print industry. White Door Publishing also published two books of his work: "Of Time and Place" which won the Printing Industries of America, Inc. "Best of Category for 1997" award, and "Reflections" in 1999.

== Exhibitions ==
- Anderson House Work Bench in Ephraim, Door County, Wisconsin
- Cottage Row Framing and Gallery in Fish Creek, Door County, Wisconsin
- Maritime Gallery at Mystic Seaport in Mystic, Connecticut

== Awards and honors ==
- Hoyne Award
- Modern Marine Master
- Museum Purchase Award at the 27th International – Mystic Maritime Museum Gallery
- US Art Magazine Hall of Fame
- Best of Category for 1997 and 1999 – Printing Industries of America

== Publications ==
- Of Time and Place (White Door Publishing Co., 1994)
- Reflections (White Door Publishing Co., 2001
