= Harold Florsheim House =

Historic house in Illinois, United States

- U.S. National Register of Historic Places
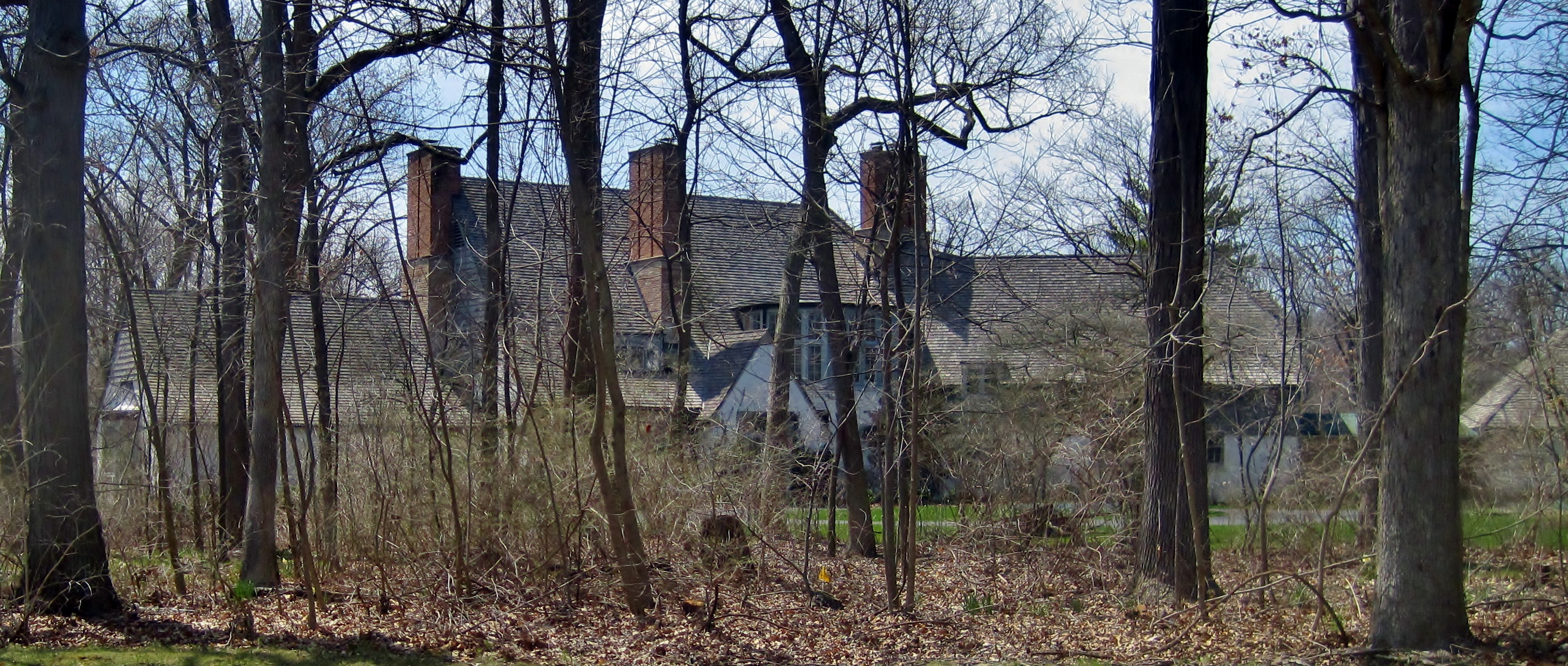

- Location within Chicago metropolitan area Location within Illinois Location within the United States
- Location: 650 Sheridan Rd., Highland Park, Illinois
- Coordinates: 42°09′51″N 87°46′22″W
- Area: 3.5 acres (1.4 ha)
- Built: 1925-28
- Architect: Ernest Grunsfeld, Jens Jensen
- Architectural style: French Chateau
- MPS: Highland Park MRA
- NRHP reference No.: 82002560
- Added to NRHP: September 29, 1982

The Harold Florsheim House is a historic house at 650 Sheridan Road in Highland Park, Illinois. The house was built in 1925–28 for businessman Harold M. Florsheim, who later became the president of Florsheim Shoes. Chicago architect Ernest Grunsfeld, who went on to design the Adler Planetarium, designed the house in the French Chateau style. The house includes a gable above the entrance, a multi-story three-sided bay window, casement windows, and a hip roof broken by dormers. Landscape architect Jens Jensen designed the house's grounds, making use of a ravine on the property to instill a sense of privacy.

The house was added to the National Register of Historic Places on September 29, 1982.
