= Mink River =

River in Door County, Wisconsin, United States

- Rogers Lake
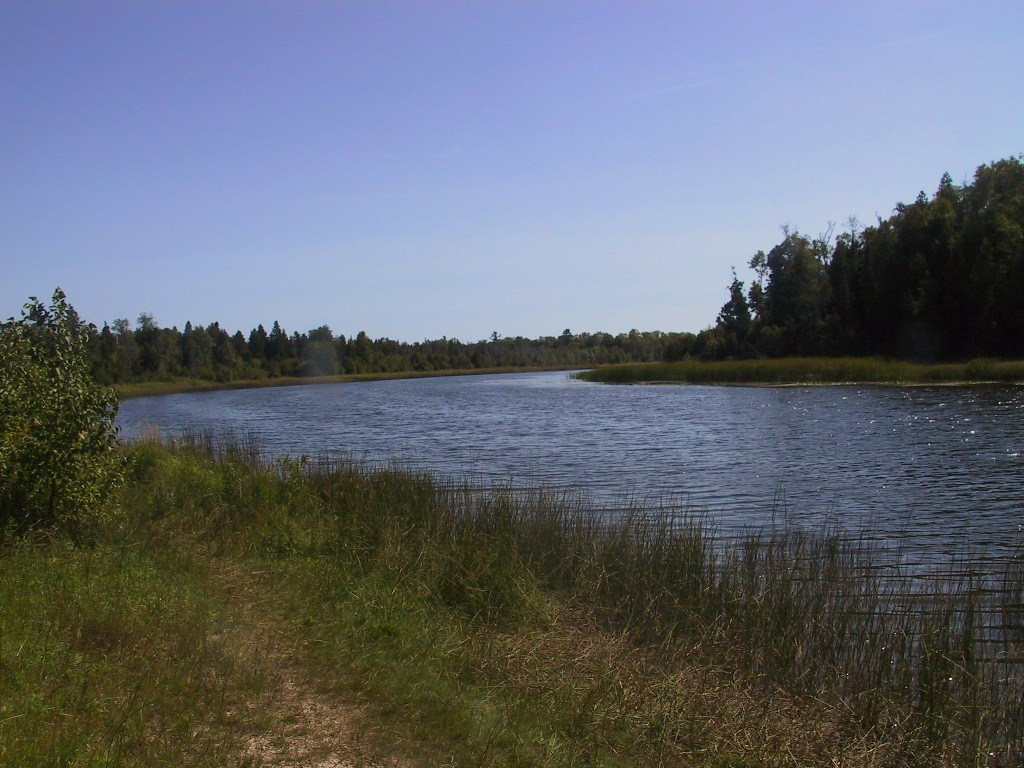
- Mink River in September

- Location within Wisconsin Location within the United States
- Location: Door County, Wisconsin
- Coordinates: 45.237064°N 87.039356°W
- Primary outflows: Rowleys Bay, Lake Michigan
- Max. length: 1.4 miles (2.3 km)
- Surface elevation: 581 feet (177 m)
- Settlements: Liberty Grove

The Mink River is a 1.4-mile-long (2.3 km) lacustuary, or freshwater estuary, near the northern tip of the Door Peninsula of Wisconsin, in the United States. It is noted for its excellent bass fishing, and the area boasts more than 200 species of birds. The river flows in a southeasterly direction into the estuary on Rowleys Bay, Lake Michigan, 4 miles (6 km) southeast of the village of Ellison Bay.

In 1989, 35 species of birds were found in two habitats in the Mink River Estuary.

Upper Mink River at the far lower left

Mink River

== See also ==
- List of lakes of Wisconsin § Door County (Rodgers Lake)
