= Ford Proving Grounds =

Testing sites for automotive products

Ford Motor Company operates several proving grounds worldwide, for development and validation testing of new vehicles.

== North America ==
=== Arizona Proving Ground (APG) – Wittmann, Arizona ===
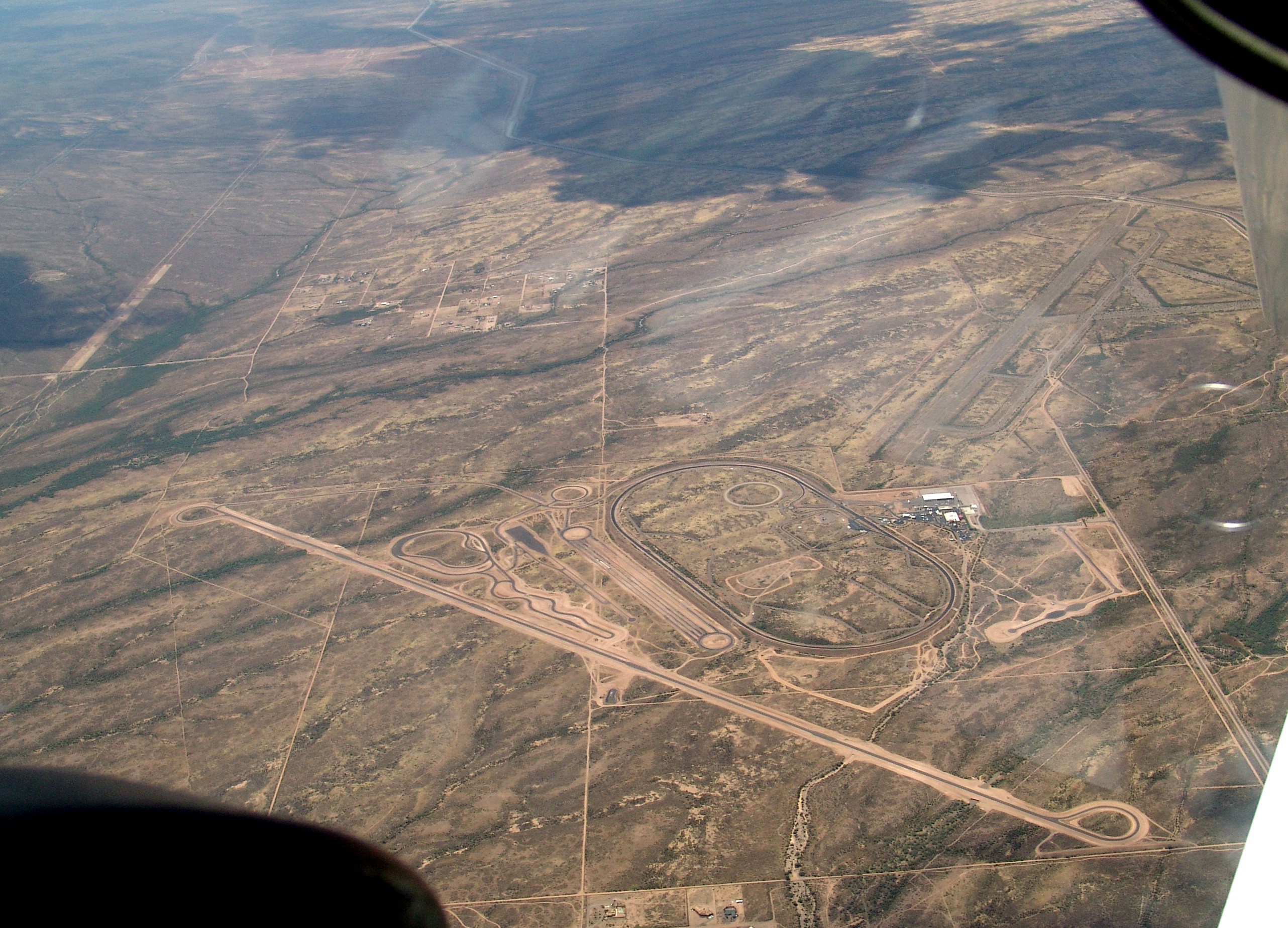
Aerial view of the Ford Arizona Proving Ground

- Latitude and longitude: 33°42′23.02″N 112°30′23.75″W

The Arizona Proving Ground opened in 1985. The Proving Ground consists of 1,498 acres (6.06 km^{2}) located less than one hour northwest of the Phoenix Sky Harbor Airport at an elevation of 1,650 feet (500 m). The facility was originally a Volvo facility (VAPG) but was transitioned to the Ford branding in the summer of 2009 and renamed the Arizona Proving Ground (APG). Volvo still is a large user of it.

It features a 2-mile oval track with banked curves, a 2-mile completely straight road, a brake test area and some more tracks.

The Arizona Proving Ground is operated year round. The climate is of a desert type with low annual rainfall and low relative humidity. Daytime temperatures are high throughout the summer months. The winters are mild. Nighttime temperatures frequently drop below freezing during the three coldest months, but the afternoons are usually sunny and warm. The summer heat (over 100 °F (38 °C)) is the most used time of the year, since worst case should be tested in order to cover many test cases.

The facility is located on the outskirts of Phoenix.

=== Michigan Proving Ground (MPG) – Romeo, Michigan ===
- Latitude and longitude: 42°51′0″N 83°2′24″W

The Ford Michigan Proving Ground (MPG) of Romeo, Michigan sits on 3,880 acres (15.7 km^{2}), and contains a total of over 100 miles (160 km) of roads. These grounds hold events like the Society of Automotive Engineers (SAE) Formula car competition (FSAE). This involves teams from colleges and universities around the world to compete in a competition involving both design and performance. The facility is also home to Twombly Mountain, the highest point in Macomb County.

- Major facilities: High speed track, durability/special surface roads, grades, EMC facility, road simulators, fire resistance facility, vehicle dynamics area
- Purpose: Car and truck durability, performance testing

=== Dearborn Development Center (formerly Dearborn Proving Ground (DPG)) ===
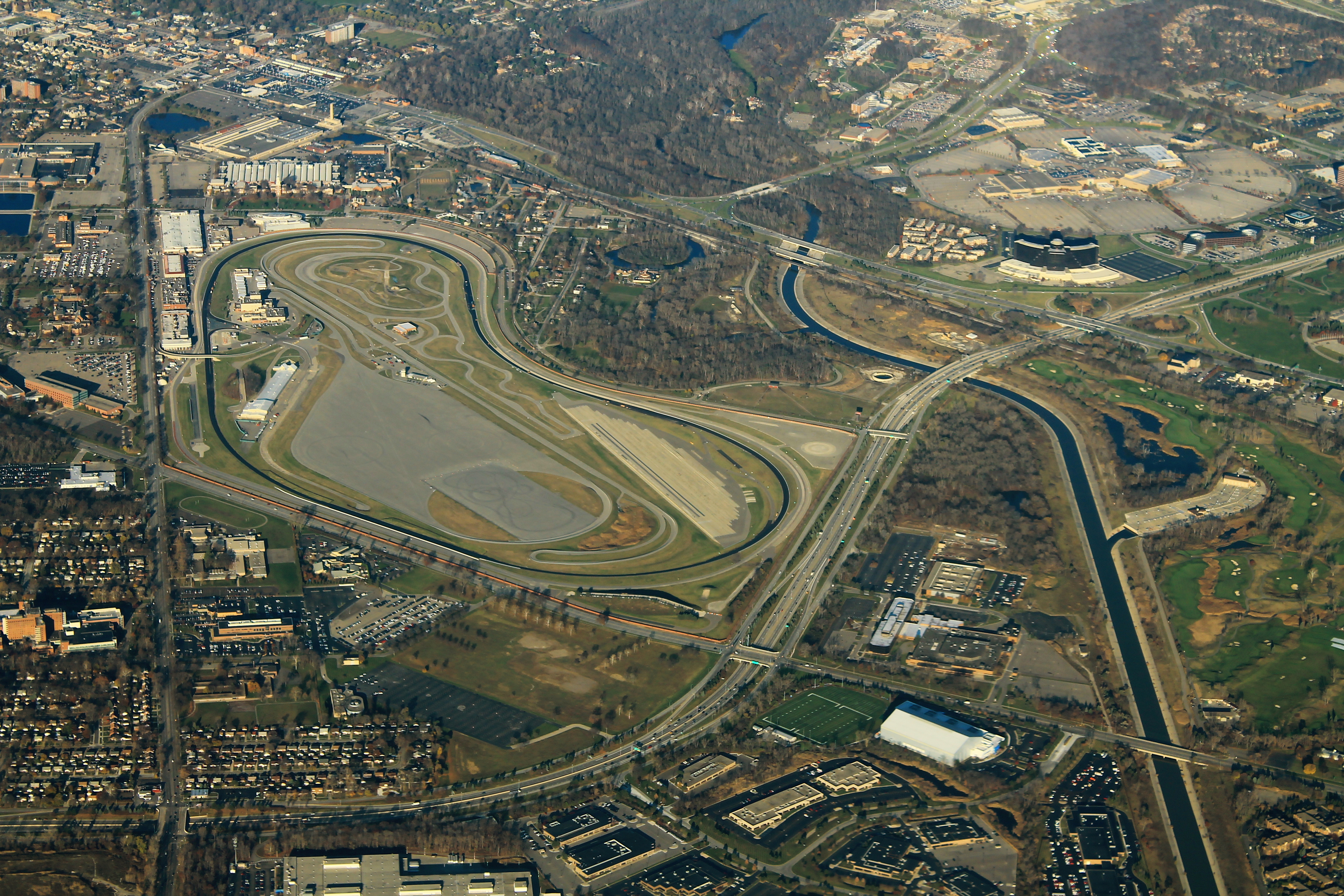
Aerial view of the Dearborn Development Center

- Latitude and longitude: 42°18′0.42″N 83°13′14.75″W

The Dearborn Development Center was built on the site of Ford Airport in Dearborn, Michigan. The facility, formerly known as Dearborn Proving Ground (DPG), completed major reconstruction and renovations in 2006.

=== Extreme Cold Weather Test Facility (ECWTF) – Thompson, Manitoba ===
- Latitude and longitude: 55°47′50.4″N 97°51′42.4″W

The facility is located at the nearby Thompson Airport in Thompson, Manitoba, Canada. The Extreme Cold Weather Test Facility offers vehicle testing in extremely cold weather conditions during the winter months from around November 1 to March 30.

=== Cuautitlan Proving Ground – Ford of Mexico – Cuautitlan, Mexico ===
- Latitude and longitude: 19°38′39″N 99°11′27″W
- Stats : 245 acres (1 km^{2}), 5 miles (8 km) of roads
- Major facilities: High speed track, special surface/low speed track, straightaway, handling course, grades, corrosion/salt bath, twin rolls
- Major testing: Performance, ride, and handling; corrosion testing; emissions certification

=== Cold Climate Test Facility – Baudette, Minnesota ===
- Stats: Avg. temps are −30 °F (−34 °C) to +10F during winter months
- Major facilities: Cold start positions, snow ingestion building
- Major testing: Cold weather starting/drives, snow ingestion

=== Automatic Transmission New Product Center – Livonia, Michigan ===
- Latitude and longitude: 42°22′17.1″N 83°23′51.6″W
- Major facilities: High speed track. Park pawl test ramp. Cold soak chambers

== South America ==
=== Tatui Proving Ground (TPG), São Paulo, Brazil ===
- Latitude and longitude: 23°23′33″S 47°55′0″W
- Stats : 1,200 acres (4.9 km^{2}), 33 miles (53 km) of roads
- Major facilities: High speed track, special surface/low speed track, handling course, grades, salt bath, environmental exposure area
- Major testing: Performance, ride, and handling; environmental simulation, corrosion testing

== Europe ==
=== Dunton Technical Centre (DTC) – Basildon, Essex, England ===
- Latitude and longitude: 51°34′57″N 0°24′14″E

Proving ground for Ford UK.

=== Lommel Proving Grounds (LPG) – Lommel, Belgium ===
- Latitude and longitude: 51°11′52.65″N 5°19′40.02″E

The Lommel Proving Grounds, also known as Ford LPG, were constructed on land rented from the city of Lommel from 1960.

- Stats: 796 acres (3.22 km^{2}), 49.7 miles (80.0 km) of roads
- Major facilities: Humidity chambers, salt water/mud baths, straightaway, high speed track, durability road, special surfaces, side wind facility
- Major testing: Car and light truck durability; performance, ride, and handling

== Australia ==
=== You Yangs Proving Ground ===
You Yangs Proving Ground was opened by Ford Australia in You Yangs, Victoria, Australia in 1965. In 1971 a high speed test track was completed by Leighton Contractors.

== Former Ford Proving Grounds ==
=== Arizona Proving Ground (APG) – Yucca, Arizona ===
- Latitude and longitude: 34°52′29″N 114°7′31″W

Arizona Proving Ground (APG) was sold to Chrysler in 2007. This is no longer a Ford facility.

=== Cold Climate Test Facility – Raco, Michigan ===
- Latitude and longitude: 46°21′10.03″N 84°49′5.55″W

Facility now owned by Smithers Scientific Services

=== Florida Evaluation Center (FEC) – Naples, Florida ===
- Latitude and longitude: 26°10′9.58″N 81°30′1.08″W

This facility is no longer leased by Ford. Ford sold the facility in 2002 to Harley Davidson. It has been taken over by Chrysler in early 2013 with Harley-Davidson leasing parts of the facility.

- Stats: 530 acres (2.1 km^{2}), 6.2 miles (10 km) of roads
- Major facilities: Straightaway, lane change area, handling course, sound test area
- Major testing: Warm weather performance and handling
