= Ernest Loeb House =

Historic house in Illinois, United States

- U.S. National Register of Historic Places
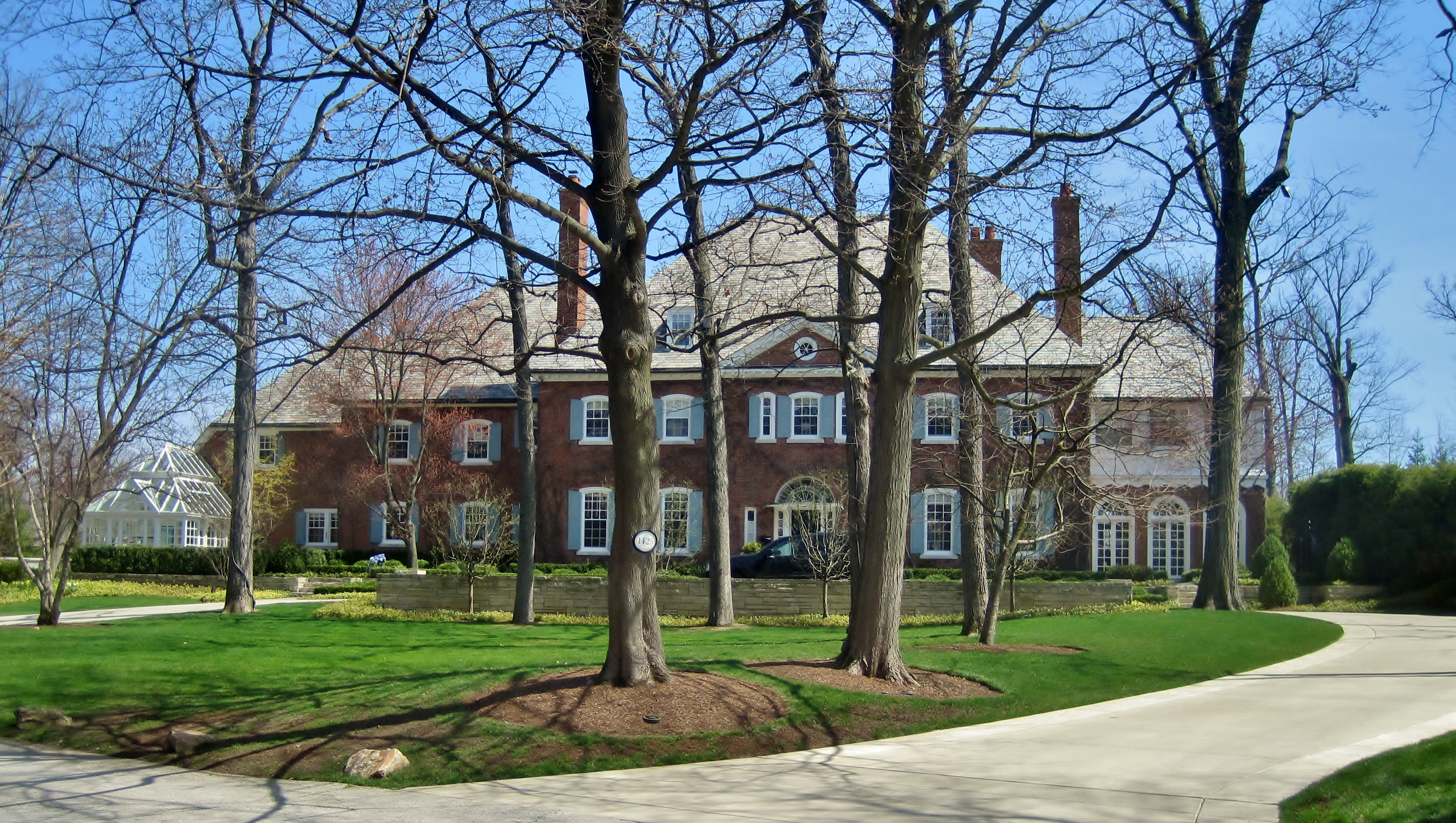

- Location within Chicago metropolitan area Location within Illinois Location within the United States
- Location: 1425 Waverly Road, Highland Park, Illinois
- Coordinates: 42°10′44″N 87°46′57″W
- Area: 3 acres (1.2 ha)
- Built: 1930
- Architect: Arthur Heun
- Architectural style: Georgian
- MPS: Highland Park MRA
- NRHP reference No.: 83000321
- Added to NRHP: May 18, 1983

The Ernest Loeb House is a historic house at 1425 Waverly Road in Highland Park, Illinois. The house was built in 1930 for Ernest Loeb. Architect Arthur Heun, who also designed a nearby home for Loeb's brother Allan, designed the house in the Georgian Revival style. The house's design includes a brick exterior, a fanlight above the front door, a pediment at the roofline above the entrance, and a hip roof. Landscape architect Jens Jensen designed the house's grounds, which feature characteristic elements of Jensen's work such as curved paths and native plants.

The house was added to the National Register of Historic Places on May 18, 1983.
