= Ford Airport (Dearborn) =

- IATA: none; ICAO: none

Summary
- Serves: Dearborn, Michigan, United States
- Location: Dearborn, Michigan, United States
- Built: 1924
- Coordinates: 42°18′N 83°13′W
- Interactive map of Ford Airport

Ford Airport in Dearborn, Michigan, United States, was one of the first modern airports in the world. It operated from 1924 to 1947. The site is now part of Ford Motor Company's Dearborn Proving Ground. The airport was about 360 acres (150 ha) in size.

This airport saw many world and U.S. "firsts": the first U.S. airport hotel, the first concrete runways, the first U.S. scheduled passenger service, the first contracted airmail service, the first radio control for a commercial flight, and the first U.S. passenger terminal. The buildings were designed by architect Albert Kahn and are considered to have greatly influenced the design of airports throughout the U.S.

The original aircraft facilities were in use as part of the Ford testing facilities at the proving ground. However, the original (greatly modified) passenger terminal was demolished in 1961, and the remaining hangar, used as an experimental engine test facility since the late 1940s, was demolished in 2018. Only The Dearborn Inn, a hotel that was built across the road to serve the airport, remains.

== Historical timeline ==
- 1924: 20,000 square foot (1,900 m^{2}) Stout Metal Airplane Company factory opens (the Ford family were major investors and provided the land)
- 1924: November, Ford Airport is dedicated as the first modern airport, equipped with two grass runways and flood lights for night landings.
- 1925: Henry Ford builds the largest, most modern and only privately owned permanent dirigible mooring mast. It was only used twice and demolished in 1946.
- 1925: Ford Air Transport Service between "Detroit" (Dearborn) and Chicago begins.
- 1925–31: Annual National Air Tour to demonstrate safety and reliability of commercial aviation starts and ends at Ford Airport.
- 1926: First regularly scheduled airline service begun by Stout on July 31 – between Grand Rapids and Dearborn.

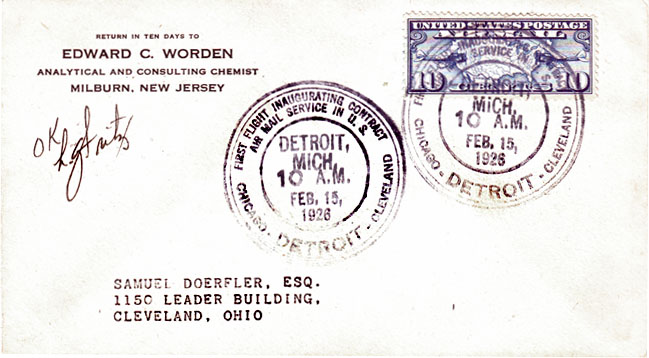
Cover carried on the first CAM flight, Feb. 15, 1926

- 1926: First ever commercial Contract Airmail Route flights made over routes CAM-6 (Detroit-Cleveland) and CAM-7 (Detroit-Chicago) in a Ford Air Transport Service Stout 2-AT Pullman
- 1926: First successful radio guided flight, using system developed by Ford Motor Company.
- 1926: Stout factory is replaced with a 62,000 square foot (5,800 m^{2}) facility to build new Ford Tri-Motors using assembly line production for the first time.
- 1927: First airport terminal with a waiting room and ticket office for passengers.
- 1928–29: Grass runways are paved—the second concrete runways in the world, after Clermont-Ferrand Auvergne Airport in France.
- 1931: July 1, the Dearborn Inn opens—one of the first hotels built to service the air traveler.
- 1938: First vehicle test track is laid down around outside of the runways.
- 1947: October 21, Ford Air Transport Office moves to Detroit Metropolitan Airport, ending Ford Airport operations.
- 1961: Aug 11, passenger terminal razed.
- 2003: June 9, five vintage airplanes, including two Ford Tri-Motors, fly into Dearborn Proving Grounds; the first time in 56 years the test track is used as an airport. The planes were part of the "Taking Flight: Ford's History in Aviation" exhibit, which was one facet of Ford Motor Company's 100th anniversary celebration.
- 2005: Major reconstruction and renovation work adds more test track surfaces and handling courses.
- 2006: Site renamed as the Dearborn Development Center
- 2018: Original main hangar demolished.
