= The Dearborn Inn =

- Dearborn Inn and Colonial Homes
- U.S. National Register of Historic Places
- Michigan State Historic Site
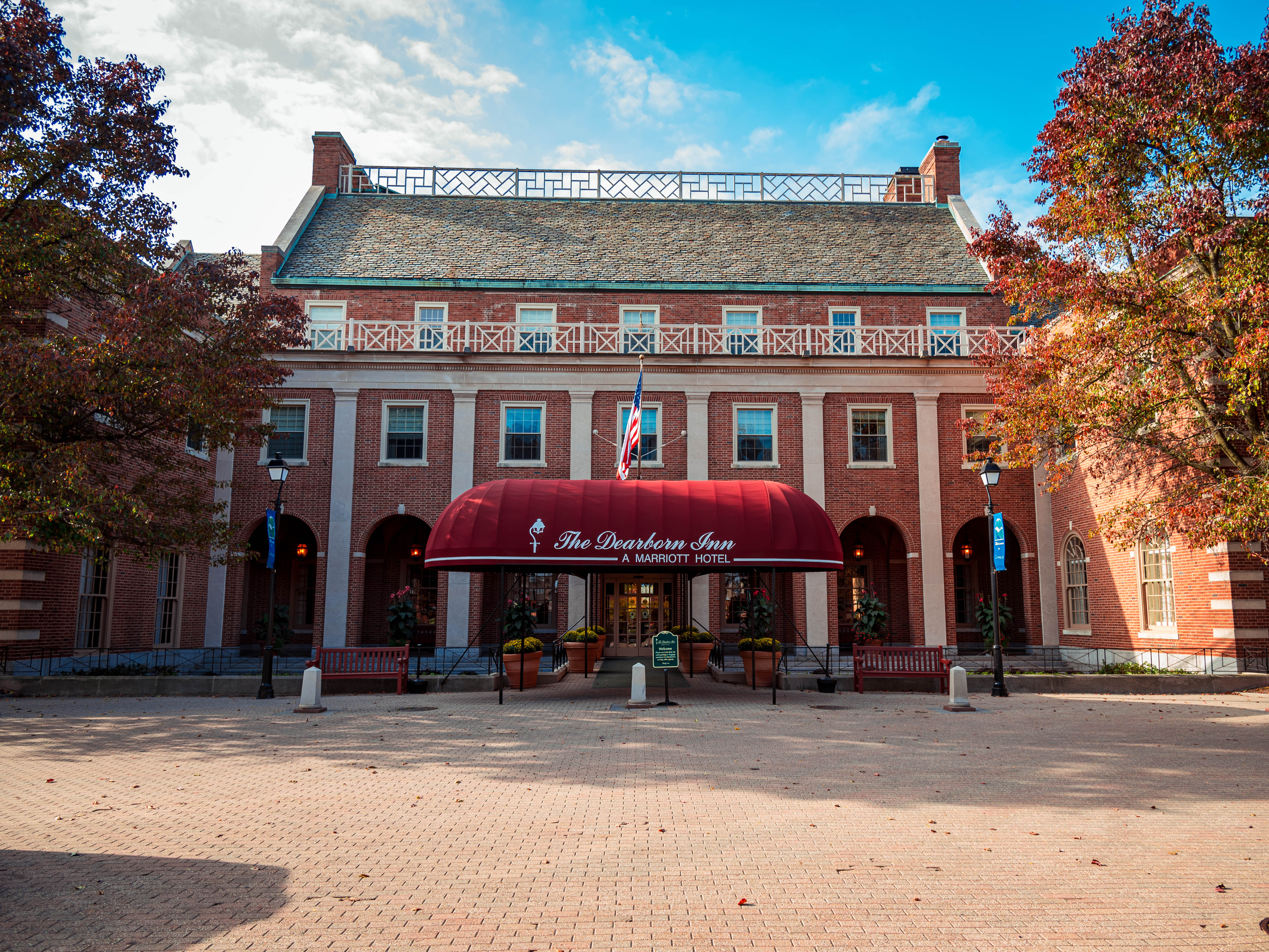
- The Dearborn Inn

- Location within Michigan Location within the United States
- Interactive map
- Location: 20301 Oakwood Boulevard; Dearborn, Michigan
- Coordinates: 42°17′48″N 83°13′41″W
- Area: 16 acres (6.5 ha)
- Built: 1931; 95 years ago
- Architect: Albert Kahn
- Architectural style: Georgian
- NRHP reference No.: 82000549

Significant dates
- Added to NRHP: December 10, 1982
- Designated MSHS: February 10, 1983

The Dearborn Inn is a historic hotel in the suburban city of Dearborn, Michigan in Metro Detroit. It opened in 1931 and reopened on March 19, 2025 after over two years of renovation and refurbishment. It was conceived by Henry Ford, who saw a need for food and accommodations for visitors flying into the nearby Ford Airport, making it one of the first airport hotels. It is located at 20301 Oakwood Boulevard near the Henry Ford Museum of American Innovation and the world headquarters building of Ford Motor Company. Albert Kahn designed the Dearborn Inn in the Georgian architectural style. The Dearborn Inn is owned by Ford Motor Land Development Corporation and managed by Marriott International.

== Features ==
Inspired by a passion for Colonial Revival architecture, Henry Ford commissioned renowned architect Albert Kahn to design The Dearborn Inn, who in 1931 would create a Georgian inn to serve Ford's Dearborn airport. The Dearborn hotel is now recognized on the National Register of Historic Places and features 231 rooms, including five Colonial guest homes, built in 1937. While thoughtful interior renovations have occurred over the Dearborn hotel's 82-year history, the exterior has remained the same as Ford's original vision. Additional features include Edison's, a fine dining restaurant; the Ten Eyck Tavern, a home-style dining establishment; a seasonal outdoor pool; and 17,000 square feet (1,600 m^{2}) of meeting space including the Alexandria Ballroom, which Ford commissioned to satisfy his love of dancing.

== History ==
In 1931, Henry Ford determined the need for lodging near his airport in Dearborn, Michigan, and he commissioned prominent architect Albert Kahn, who built many of Detroit's magnificent landmarks to design The Dearborn Inn. Characteristically, Ford took a very active part in the development of the hotel.

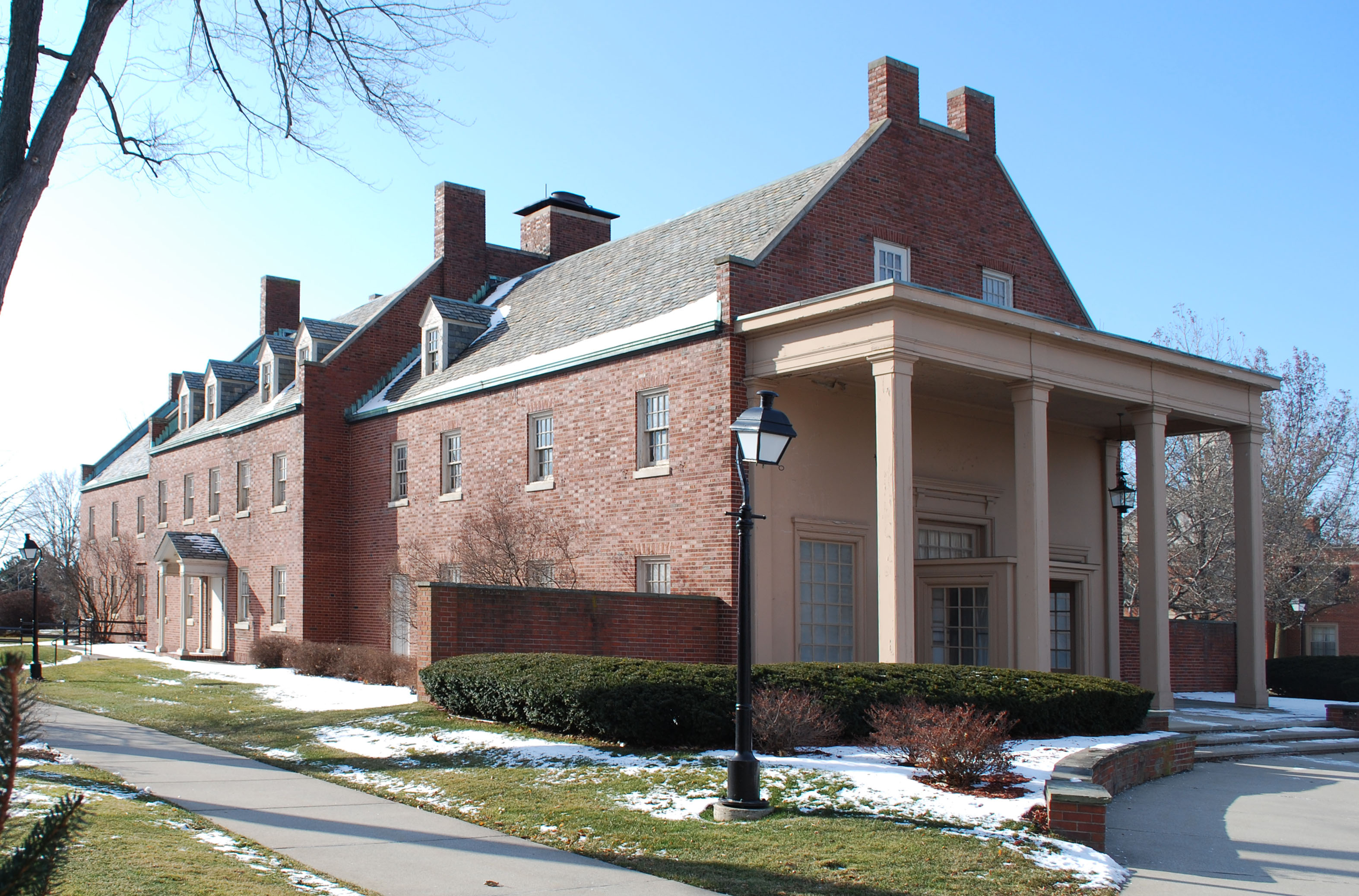
Colonial building on the Dearborn Inn campus

The Dearborn Inn was situated on a 23-acre (93,000 m^{2}) site on Oakwood Boulevard across the street from Ford Airport. The Colonial Revival style of the Inn was in harmony with the nearby Edison Institute, and the Inn's décor was early American colonial, a style favored by Henry Ford. With great fanfare, The Dearborn Inn opened for business in July 1931; Henry Ford was the first person to sign the guestbook.

Though the Ford Airport closed in 1933, replaced by the Ford vehicle test track, The Dearborn Inn continued to offer accommodations and dining, as the hotel already had a reputation as one of the nation's premier inns.

In 1933, the Dormitory Building was added to house employees of The Dearborn Inn; however, in the 1960s, it was converted into changing rooms for The Dearborn Inn's Swim Club.

Five replica homes were constructed in 1937, creating a small Colonial Village and adding 31 guestrooms to the Inn. Guests today can still enjoy a stay in the reproduction homes of famous Americans: Edgar Allan Poe, Walt Whitman, Barbara Fritchie, Oliver Wolcott, and Patrick Henry. While the original plan called for 18 historic homes in the Colonial Village, World War II halted further expansion. During the war, pilots from the Detroit airport, just a few miles away, had special accommodations on the Inn's first floor, and today, one wing of the first floor is still known as “Pilot’s Row”.

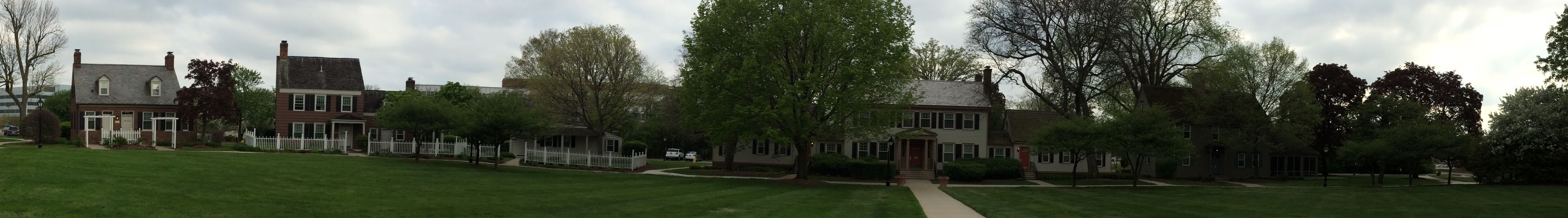
Panorama of the Replica buildings

The Dearborn Inn secured its place in hospitality history with many industry “firsts”. It was called the first airport hotel when it opened although the Oakland Airport Inn had, in fact, opened two years earlier. In 1937, it became the nation's first hotel to have air conditioning, and in 1961, it was the first hotel in Michigan to install a direct-dial telephone system for guests. The Dearborn hotel is also said to have influenced the evolution of destination resorts and is considered to be one of the industry's first such properties. The hotel offered families many popular activities of the era, such as horseback riding, tennis, badminton, ballroom dancing for adults, a playground for children, and even sightseeing trips over Detroit and Windsor, Ontario in a Ford Trimotor airplane.

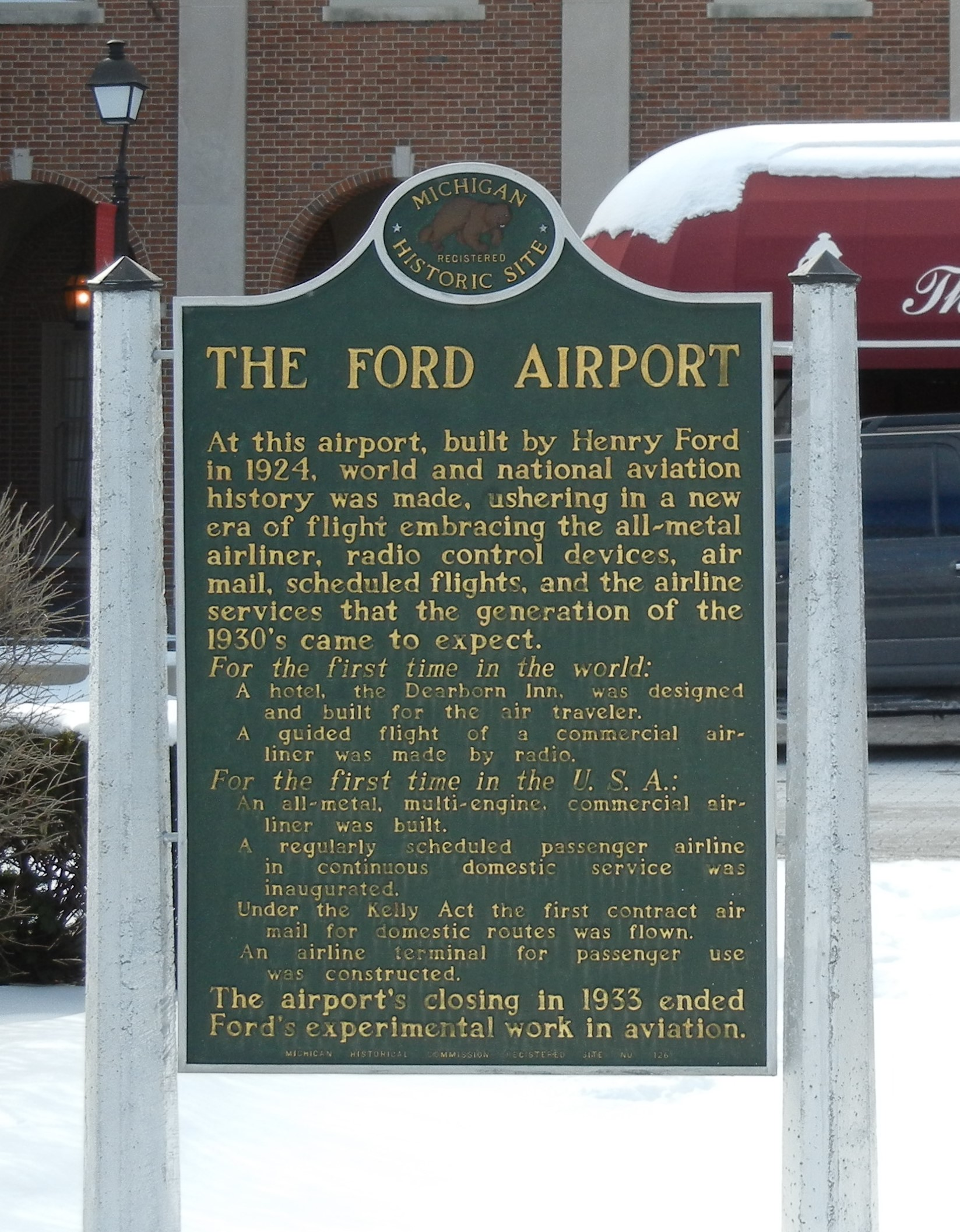
Historical Marker on the hotel grounds

In 1960, two motor lodges were completed, adding another 54 rooms to The Dearborn Inn complex. Named after two geniuses of American ingenuity admired by Henry Ford, the Burbank House (in honor of horticulturalist Luther Burbank) and the McGuffey House (in honor of Dr. William Holmes McGuffey, author of the McGuffey Readers) were designed to offer larger rooms and suites for families and bridal couples.

Ballroom dancing was one of Henry Ford's great passions, and, emulating a space he had admired in Virginia, Ford designed the 3,444-square-foot (320.0 m^{2}) Alexandria Ballroom to provide a place to dance with family and friends. When the Greenfield Room, now the hotel's executive offices, was added in 1965, it was said to be the first of its kind with a ground floor, drive-in meeting and exhibit room. Today, the hotel's meeting and event space includes a total of 17,000 square feet (1,600 m^{2}).

On December 10, 1982, the National Park Service placed The Dearborn Inn on the National Register of Historic Places. The Michigan State Historic Register listed The Dearborn Inn and Colonial Homes on February 10, 1983. The hotel underwent extensive renovation and expansion in 1987, which enlarged the banquet facilities, increased and completely refurbished the guestrooms, including the historical homes. Also, the grounds were extensively landscaped and three of the guest cottages were relocated to an expansive common area behind the Inn. Throughout the design and construction phases, great care was taken to maintain the historical integrity of the Inn. The hotel reopened in 1989 managed by Marriott International as The Dearborn Inn, A Marriott Hotel.

As part of its 75th anniversary, The Dearborn Inn underwent another renovation in 2008, including a complete renovation of guest rooms and corridors as well as the addition of modern technological amenities. In 2009, AAA recognized The Dearborn Inn as one of its top 10 U.S. historic hotels.

The hotel closed in February 2023 for renovations. The property had its grand re-opening on March 19, 2025 as Dearborn Inn, Autograph Collection, part of Marriott's Autograph Collection.

== Location ==
The Dearborn Inn is located two blocks from The Henry Ford, home of the Henry Ford Museum, Greenfield Village, Rouge Factory Tour, and Giant Screen Experience, and near other area attractions, such as the Henry Ford Estate, Detroit Casinos, Detroit Institute of Arts, Museum of African American History, Automobile Hall of Fame, Arab American National Museum, and the Detroit Zoo.

== See also ==
- Grand Hotel (Mackinac Island)
