= The Clearing Folk School =

- The Clearing
- U.S. National Register of Historic Places
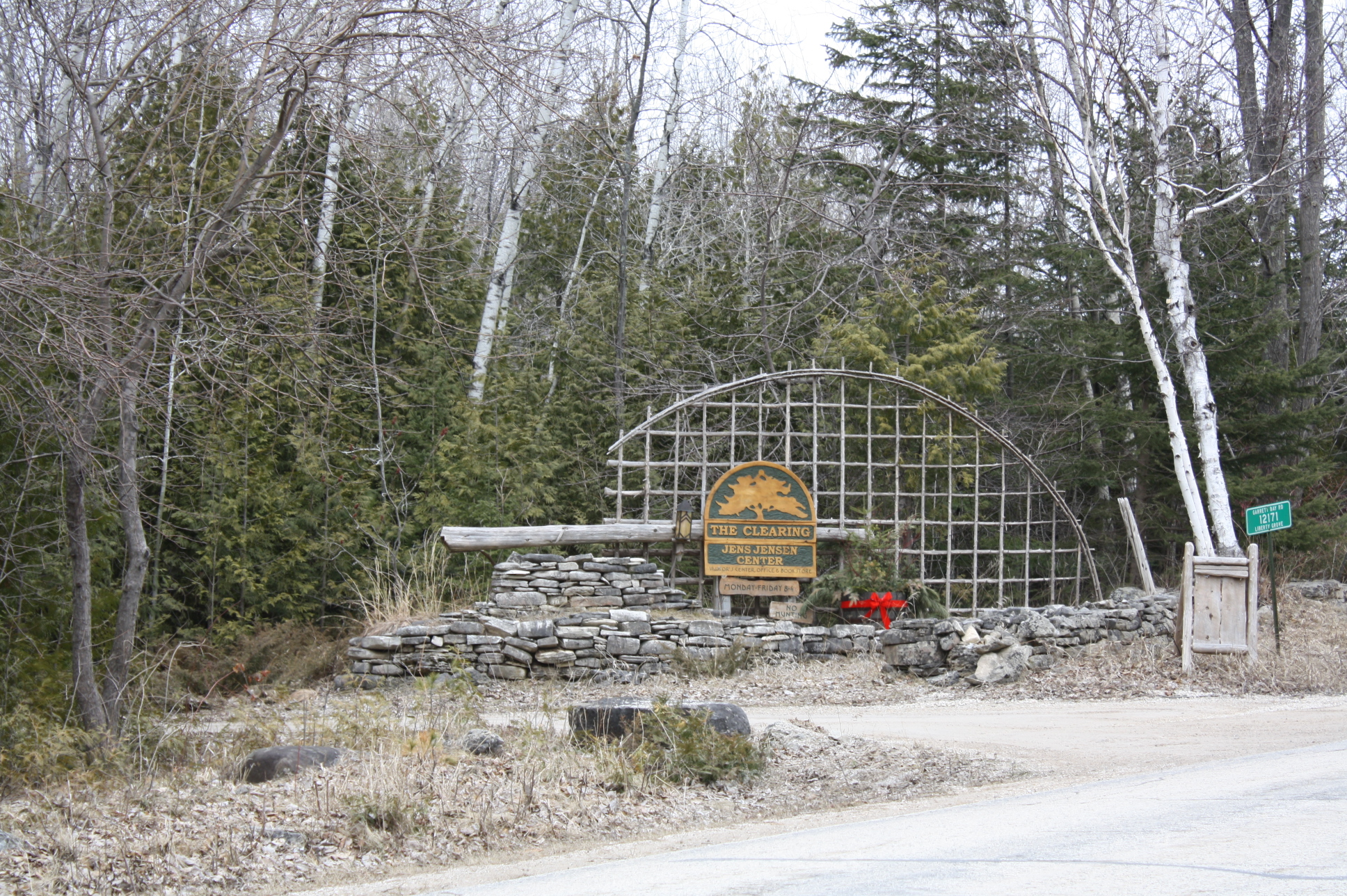
- Entrance in 2011

- Location within Wisconsin Location within the United States
- Location: Ellison Bay, Wisconsin
- Coordinates: 45.259914°N 87.071009°W
- Area: 125 acres (51 ha)
- Built: 1935
- Architect: Jens Jensen; Hugh Garden
- NRHP reference No.: 74000080
- Added to NRHP: December 31, 1974

The Clearing Folk School, usually called just The Clearing, is a 125-acre (0.51 km^{2}) continuing education institution located near Ellison Bay, Wisconsin, United States. It was founded by Jens Jensen in 1935. A successful landscape architect, Jensen began acquiring a private summer estate in 1919; the estate, re-landscaped by Jensen, became the nucleus of the school. Jensen was inspired by the folk high schools of his native Denmark.

== History ==
Jensen lived in The Clearing as a widower from 1935 until 1951. After his death, The Clearing was operated by the Wisconsin Farm Bureau for 37 years as a rural retreat, conference center, and continuing-education institution. Following The Clearing's independence as a nonprofit corporation in 1988, The Clearing has continued to fulfill these roles, with a concentration on adult education and as a meeting place for senior citizens. The Clearing describes itself as a place for "classes in natural sciences, fine arts, skilled crafts and humanities." The Clearing's emphasis on "regional ecology" is seen as providing continuity with founder Jensen's own aspirations and beliefs.

== Current status ==
The appreciation of "regional ecology" from a landscape perspective, a focus of continuing education at The Clearing, has helped to drive the emerging professions of landscape ecology and spatial ecology.

As of 2012, the Clearing offers classwork throughout the year, except for March, April, and December. Day-to-week-length appreciation classes center on collective learning through discussion, conversation, and hands-on work. During the high season (May–October), the folk school specializes in weeklong appreciation classes; in November, January, and February, day classes and daylong workshops can be experienced.

The Clearing Folk School was added to the National Register of Historic Places on December 31, 1974 as site #74000080.

== People connected with The Clearing ==
- Norbert Blei, longtime writer in residence
- Jens Jensen, founder
