= Jens Jensen (landscape architect) =

Danish-American landscape designer (1860–1951)

- Jensen in 1943

Superintendent of the Chicago Park District

Personal details
- Born: September 13, 1860 near Dybbøl, Duchy of Schleswig (now Denmark)
- Died: October 1, 1951 (aged 91) The Clearing Folk School, United States
- Spouse: Anne Marie Hansen

Jens Jensen (September 13, 1860 – October 1, 1951) was a Danish-American landscape architect.

== Biography ==
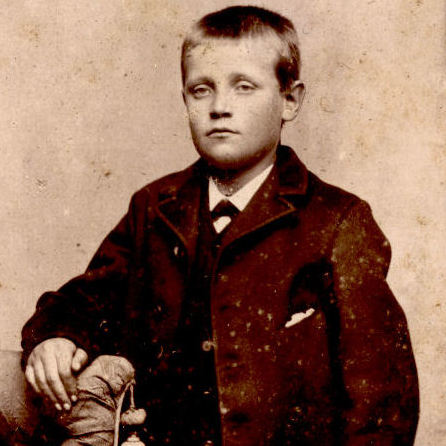
A young Jensen

Jens Jensen was born near Dybbøl, Denmark, on September 13, 1860, to a wealthy farming family. For the first nineteen years of his life he lived on his family's farm, which cultivated his love for the natural environment. When he was four years old, during the Second War of Schleswig in 1864, Jensen watched the Prussians invade his town, and burn his family's farm buildings. This invasion, which annexed the land into Prussia, left a deep influence on how Jensen viewed the world of man. He attended the Tune Agricultural School outside Copenhagen, afterwards undertaking mandatory service in the Prussian Army. During those three years, he sketched parks in the English and French character in Berlin and other German cities. By 1884, his military service over, Jensen was engaged to Anne Marie Hansen. Coupled with his wish to escape the family farm, this led to his decision to immigrate to the United States that year.

=== United States ===
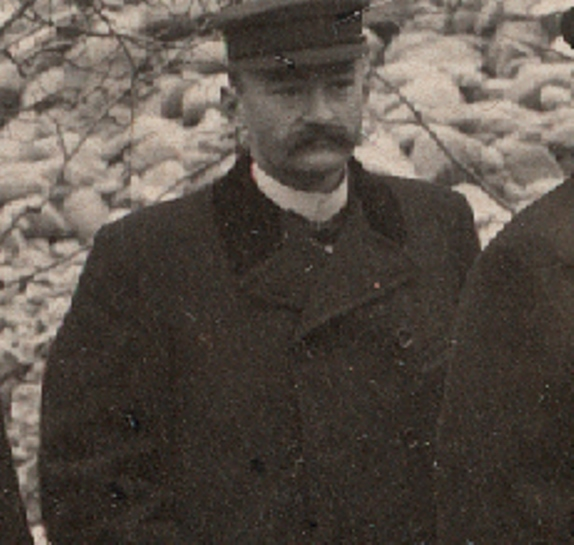
Jensen in 1901

Initially Jensen worked in Florida, and then at Luther College in Decorah, Iowa, before moving to Chicago and taking a job as a laborer for the West Park Commission. He was soon promoted to a foreman. During this time he was allowed to design and plant a garden of exotic flowers. When the garden withered and died, he traveled into the surrounding prairie and transplanted native wildflowers. Jensen transplanted the wildflowers into a corner of Union Park, creating what became the American Garden in 1888.

Working his way through the park system, Jensen was appointed superintendent of the 200 acre (800,000 m²) Humboldt Park in 1895. By the late 1890s, the West Park Commission was entrenched in corruption. After refusing to participate in political graft, Jensen was ousted by a dishonest park board in 1900. He was eventually reinstated and by 1905 he was general superintendent of the entire West Park System in Chicago. His design work for the city can be seen at Garfield Park, Humboldt Park, Douglass Park, Pulaski Park, Columbus Park, The North Park Village Nature Center water fall and pond.

Jensen helped establish the Forest Preserve District of Cook County, and selected many of the sites eventually acquired by the Forest Preserve District.

He also helped establish Jens Jensen Park near his home and the Ravinia Music Festival grounds, as well as the grounds of nearby Green Bay and Ravinia elementary schools.

In the 1910s, Jensen played a role in building support for the preservation of part of the Indiana Dunes sand dune ecosystem, also near Chicago, thwarting industrialization plans of J. P. Morgan and Andrew Carnegie.

=== Private practice ===
In 1920, he retired from the park system and started his own landscape architecture practice. He worked on private estates and municipal parks throughout the U.S. He was commissioned by Eleanor and Edsel Ford for four residences, three in Michigan and one in Maine, between 1922 and 1935. Other projects included the Morse Dell Plain House and Garden (1926) at Hammond, Indiana and the William Whitaker Landscape and House (1929) at Crown Point, Indiana.

A major landscape project, with Edsel Ford, was for 'Gaukler Point', the Edsel and Eleanor Ford House designed by architect Albert Kahn in 1929, on the shores of Lake St. Clair in Grosse Pointe Shores, Michigan for Edsel Ford and his wife. Jensen did the master plan and designed the estate's gardens. He employed his traditional 'long view,' giving visitors a glimpse of the residence down the long meadow after the passing the entry gates, then only brief partial views along the long drive, and only at the end revealing the entire house and another view back up the long meadow. The 'Gaukler Point' gardens and residence are now a public historical landscape and house museum and on the National Register of Historic Places.

He also designed the gardens for Edsel and Eleanor's summer estate 'Skylands' in Bar Harbor on Mount Desert Island in Maine (1922). Jensen did design work for their two other Michigan residences, one being 'Haven Hill,' between 1922 and 1935. 'Haven Hill', now within the Highland Recreation Area near White Lake Township in southeastern Michigan, is designated as both a Michigan State Historical Landmark and State Natural Preserve. Jensen's landscape elements, with the diversity of tree, plant and animal life, combine aesthetics, history and nature.

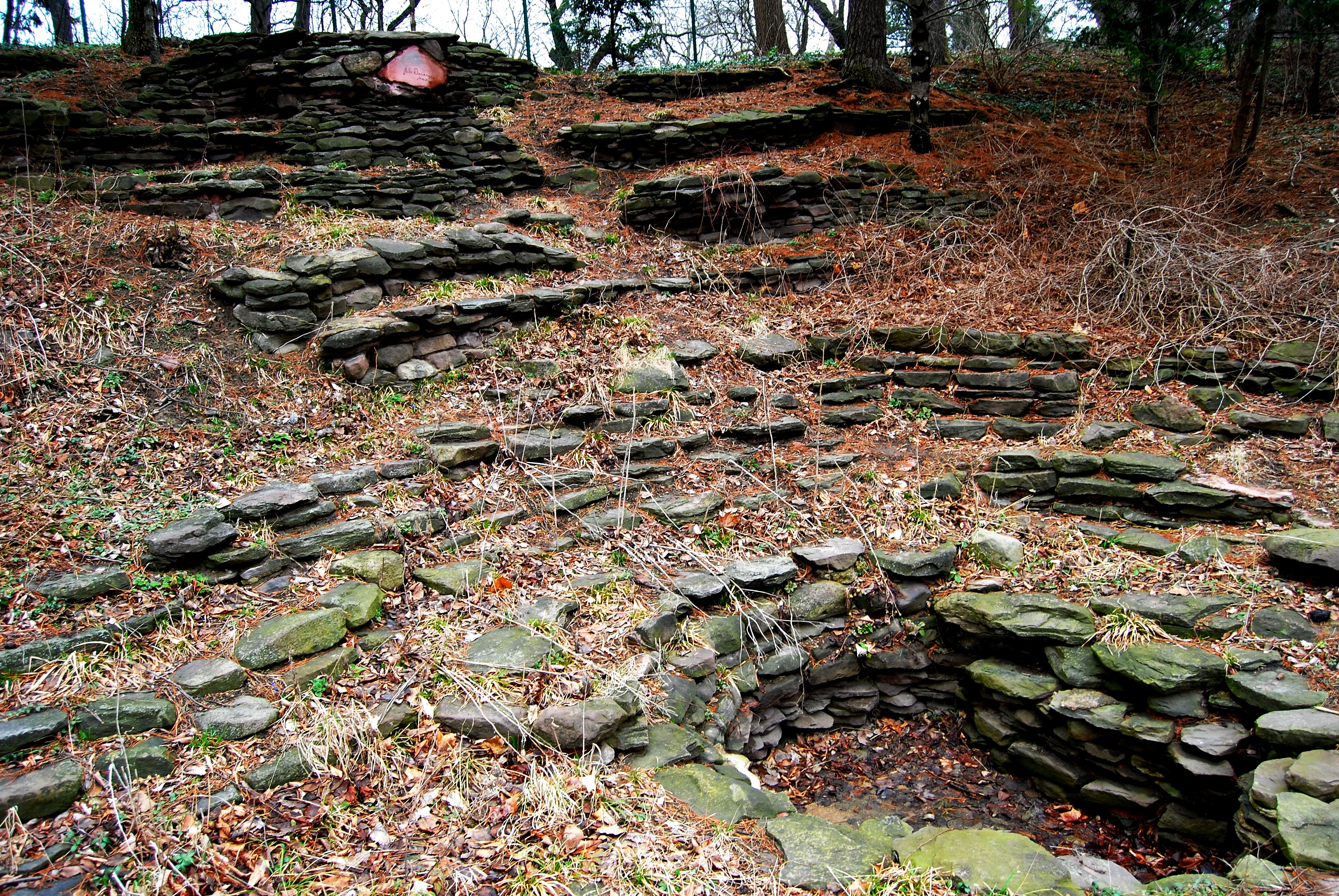
John Burroughs grotto, Henry Ford Estate

For Clara and Henry Ford Jensen employed his 'delayed view' approach in designing the arrival at the residence of their estate, Fair Lane, in Dearborn, Michigan. Instead of proceeding straight to the house or even seeing it, the entrance drive leads visitors through the estate's dense woodland areas. Bends in the drive, planted on the curves' inside arc with large trees give a feeling of a natural reason for the turn, and obscure any long view. Suddenly, the visitor is propelled out of the forest and in the open space where the residence is presented fully in view in front of them. This idea of wandering was one which Jens put forth in almost all of his designs. Expansive meadows and gardens make up the larger landscape, with naturalistic massings of flowers surrounding the house. The largest axial meadow, the "Path of the Setting Sun" is aligned so that on the summer solstice the setting sun glows through a precise parting of the trees at meadow's end. The boathouse, with stonework cliffs designed by Jensen, allowed Henry Ford to travel on the Rouge River in his electric boat. Currently 72 acres (290,000 m²) of the original estate are preserved as a historic landscape and with the house are a museum, and a National Historic Landmark.

Jensen did other projects for Henry Ford including: The Dearborn Inn, Dearborn, Michigan, in 1931 (architect Albert Kahn, the first airport hotel in the country and National Historic Landmark); the Henry Ford Hospital; the Greenfield Village historic re-creation and its Henry Ford Museum in Dearborn; and the 'Ford Pavilion' at the 1933 Chicago Century of Progress Exposition. In 1923, he designed Lincoln High School in Manitowoc, Wisconsin, on a 19-acre (7.7 ha) area on Lake Michigan. A number of projects with Jensen designed landscapes are listed on the National Register of Historic Places including the Jens Jensen Summer House and Studio, Rosewood Park, the May Theilgaard Watts House (architect; John S. Van Bergen), The A.G. Becker Property (architect; Howard Van Doren Shaw), The Samuel Holmes House (architect; Robert Seyfarth) and the Harold Florshiem estate (architect; Ernest Grunsfeld), all of which are located in Highland Park, Illinois where Jensen lived.

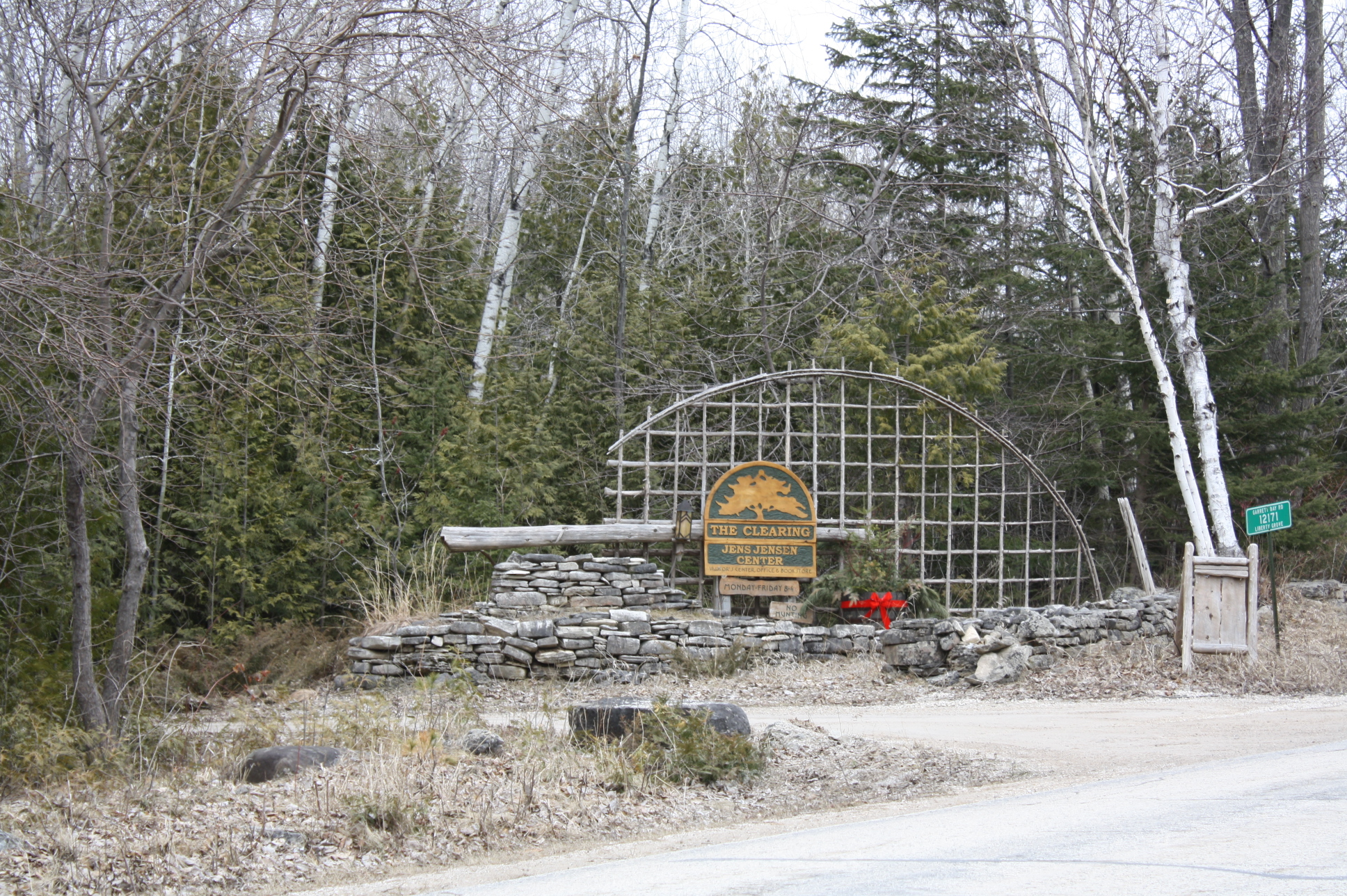
Entrance to "The Clearing"

In 1935, after the death of his wife, Jensen moved from Highland Park, Illinois to Ellison Bay, Wisconsin where he established The Clearing Folk School, which he called a "school of the soil" to train future landscape architects. It is now preserved as open space and an education center in the folk school tradition.

In his maturity, Jensen designed Lincoln Memorial Garden in Springfield, Illinois. This plan was completed in 1935 and planted from 1936 to 1939.

Jens Jensen died at his home, now The Clearing Folk School on October 1, 1951, at the age of 91.

== Collaborations ==
Jens Jensen partnered with architect Howard Van Doren Shaw. In the course of his long career he worked with many well known architects including Louis Sullivan, Frank Lloyd Wright, George Maher, Albert Kahn and Benjamin H. Marshall (architect).

== See also ==
- History of landscape architecture
- History of gardens
