= Ellison Bay, Wisconsin =

Census-designated place in Wisconsin, United States

- Census-designated place
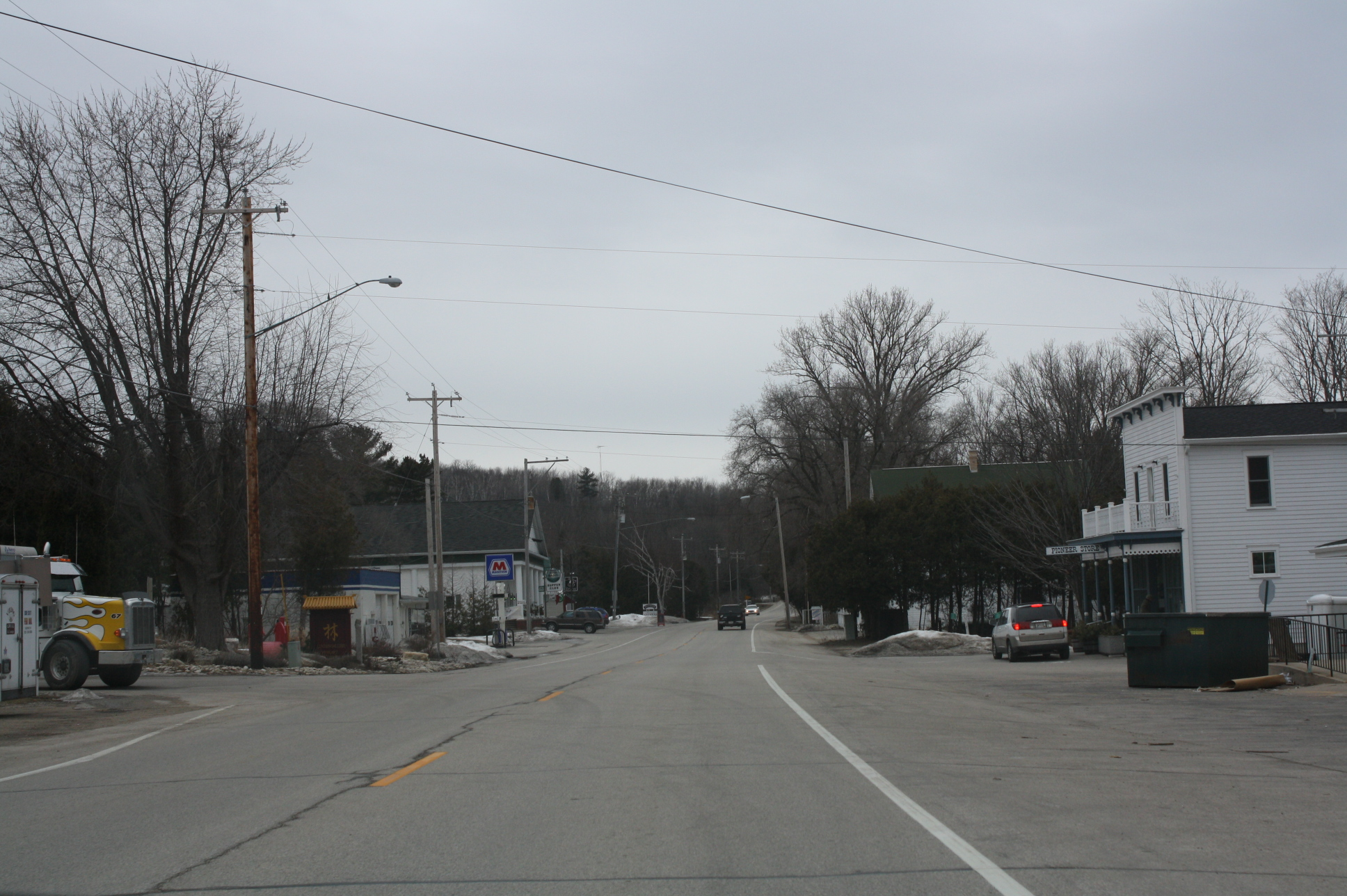
- Looking south at downtown Ellison Bay on WIS 42

- Location within the state of Wisconsin
- Coordinates: 45°15′17″N 87°04′17″W
- Country: United States
- State: Wisconsin
- County: Door
- Town: Liberty Grove
- Founded: 1872

Area
  - Total: 2.662 sq mi (6.89 km^{2})
  - Land: 2.662 sq mi (6.89 km^{2})
  - Water: 0 sq mi (0 km^{2})

Population (2020)
  - Total: 249
  - Density: 93.5/sq mi (36.1/km^{2})
- Time zone: UTC-6 (Central (CST))
  - Summer (DST): UTC-5 (CDT)
- ZIP Code: 54210
- Area code: 920

Ellison Bay is a census-designated place in northern Door County, Wisconsin, United States, within the town of Liberty Grove and is located on Highway 42 along the Green Bay. As of the 2020 census, its population is 249. Sur La Baie, one of Wisconsin's largest and most expensive homes, is located nearby.

== History ==
A Native American name for the bay was Joe-Sahbe Bay, after a son of the Potowatomi Chief Neatoshing, who was also known as Mishicott. Joe-Sahbe means "Feather of the rolling cloud".

The community was founded in 1872 by John Eliasen, a Danish immigrant. Lumber and fishing were important businesses in the 19th century, replaced by fruit growing in the early 20th century, and today tourism is the main business.

== Education ==
Gibraltar Area Schools serves the community. Gibraltar Elementary School and Gibraltar Secondary School are the two schools.

== Demographics ==
Historical population
Census	Pop.	Note	%±
2010	165		—
2020	249		50.9%
U.S. Decennial Census

== Attractions ==
Important attractions include The Clearing, a private center for adult education that was originally established by Jens Jensen, a prominent landscape architect. It is listed on the National Register of Historic Places. Other attractions include the Mink River four miles south, Turtle Ridge Gallery, a cooking school, a former church turned Asian art gallery turned coffee shop, and pottery studios.

=== Ellison Bluff ===
Ellison Bluff County Park includes a scenic hiking trail, a picnic area, and a fenced catwalk. The bluff area has wildflowers and trees. One cedar was found to be over 250 years old. Rough-winged swallows hunt for insects along the bluff. Other birds seen at the park include the American redstart, great-crested flycatcher, broad-winged hawk, wood thrush, scarlet tanager, yellow-throated vireo, and pileated woodpecker. 170 acres of the park is protected as the Ellison Bluff State Natural Area.

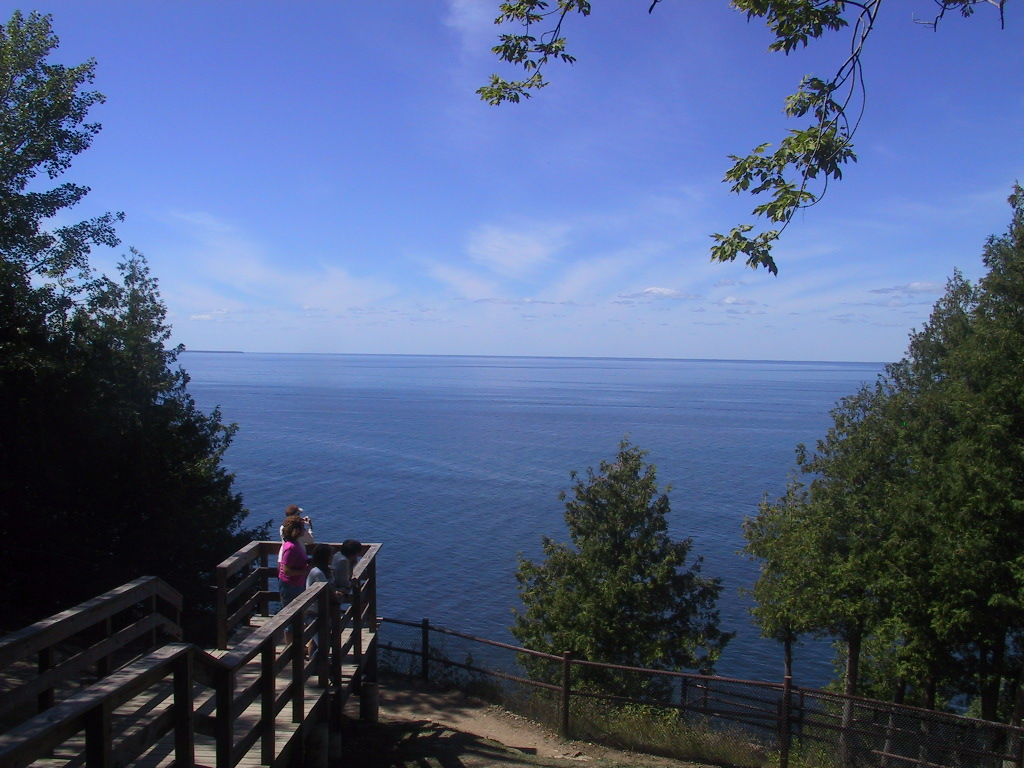
Accessible walkway

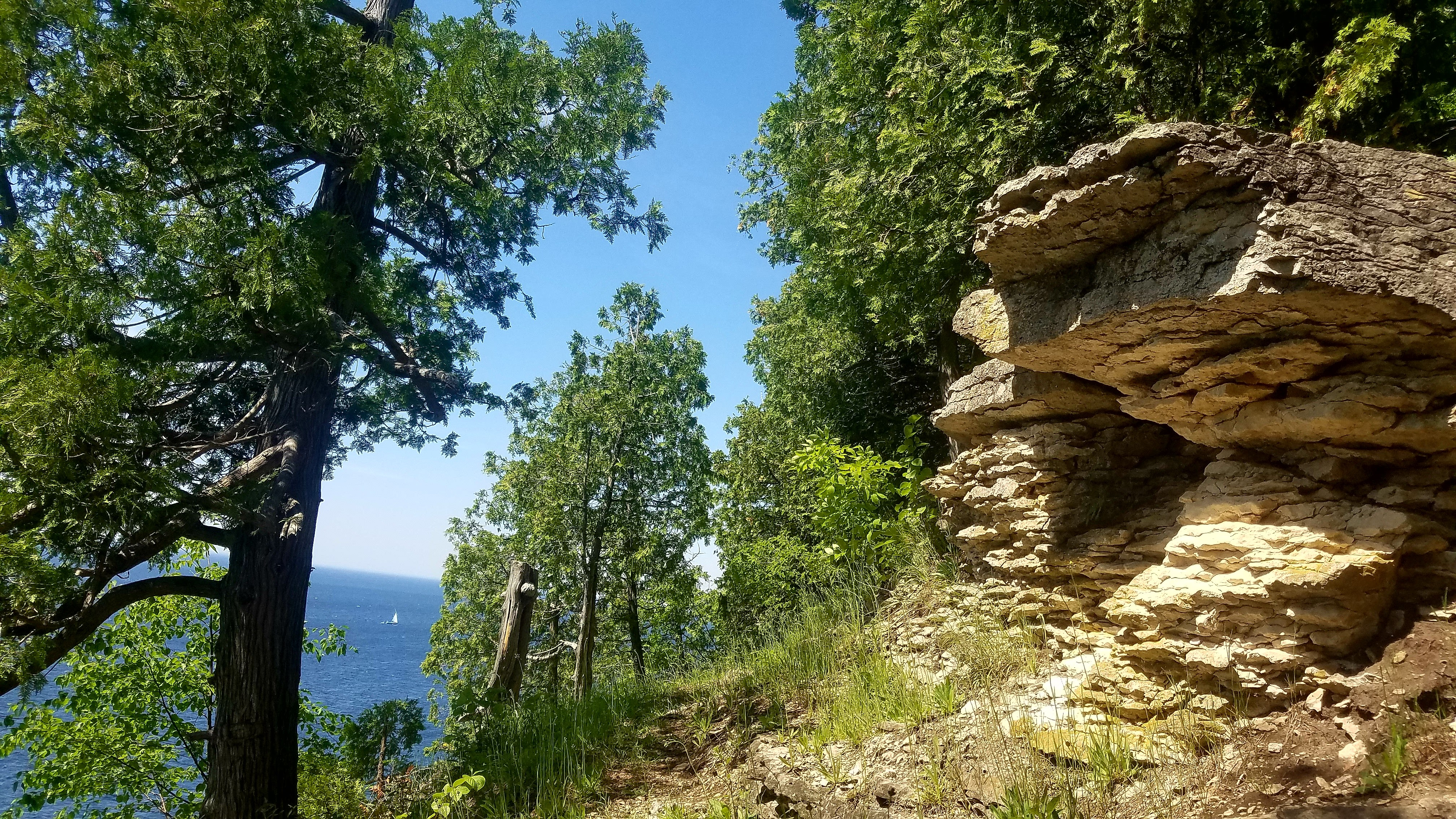
Rocky outcrop

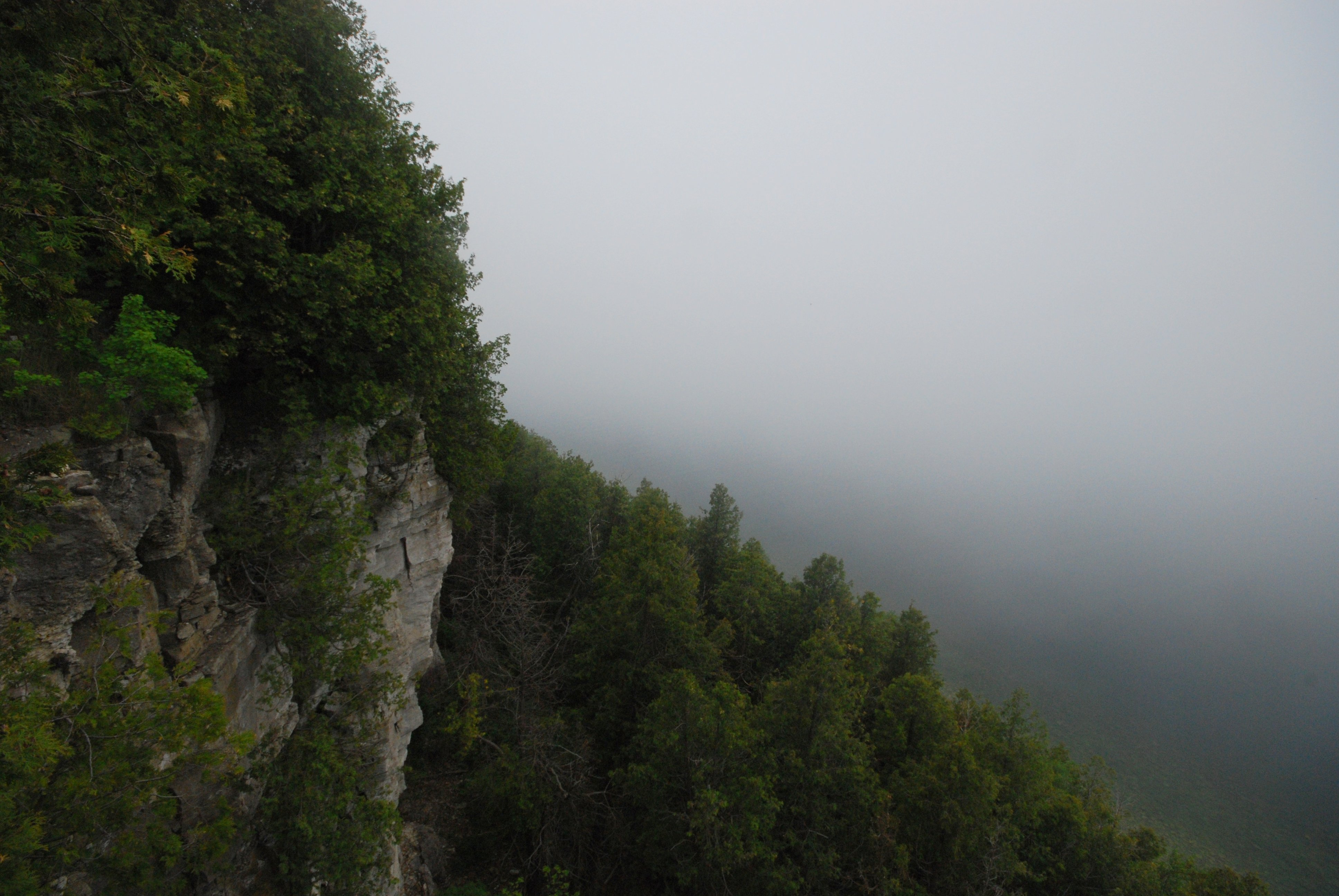
View

== 2006 explosion ==
On July 10, 2006, an explosion leveled the 136-year-old Pioneer Store, killing two vacationers and injuring 13 others. The blast also burned down one cottage and damaged another. It is believed a propane gas leak caused the explosion, which may have resulted from a contractor damaging unmarked underground propane lines.

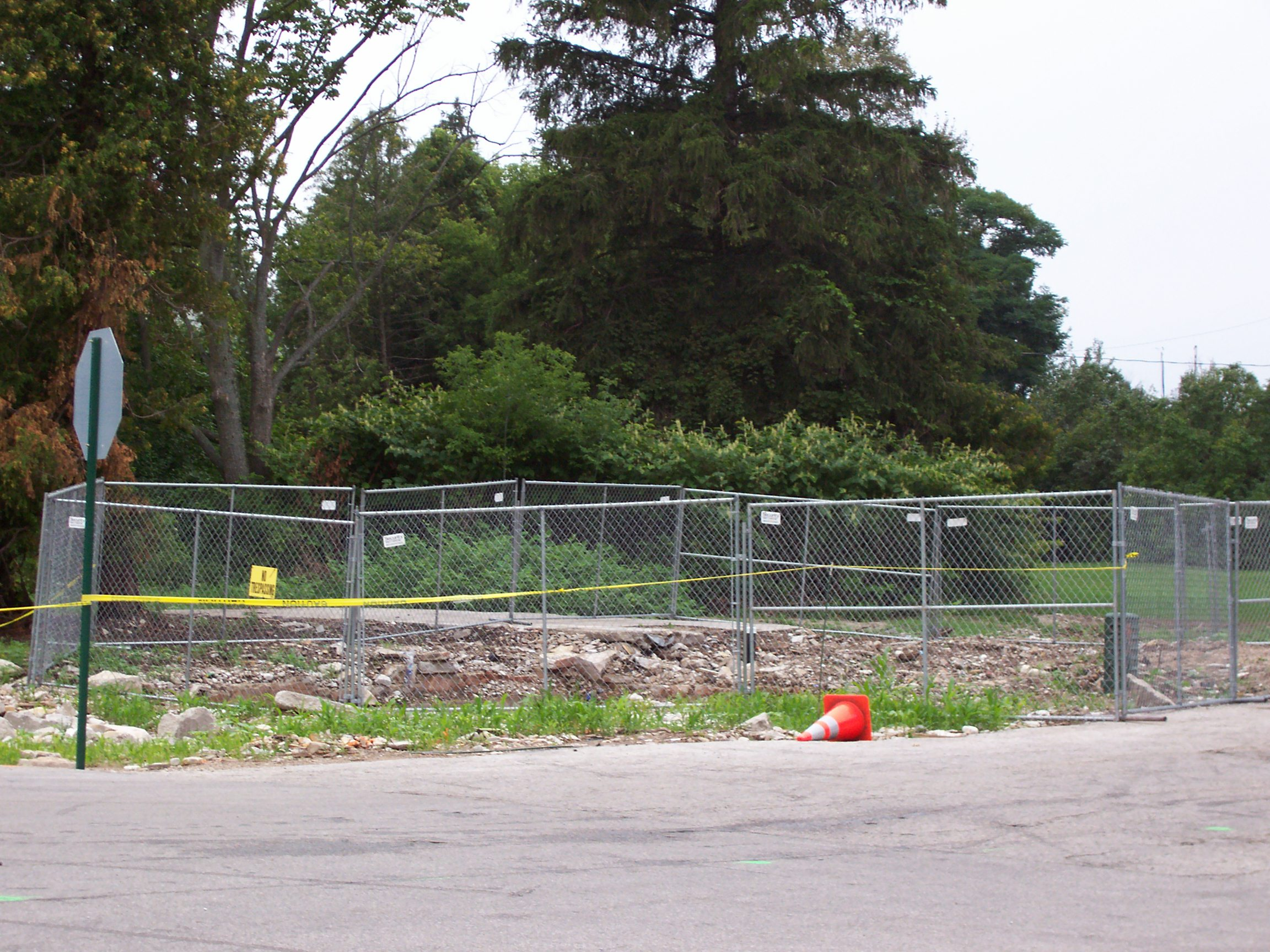
Explosion remnants

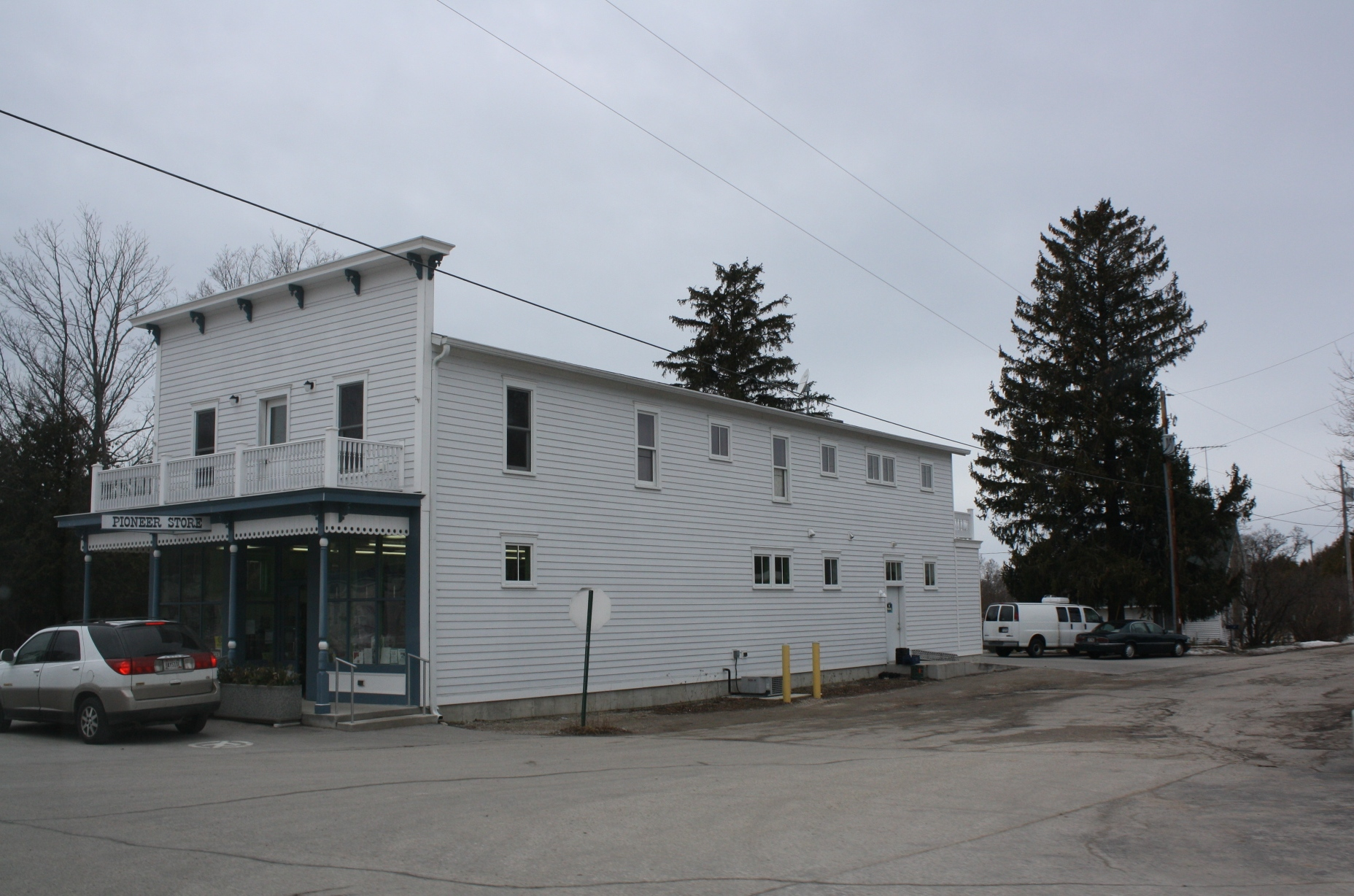
Pioneer store in 2011 after reconstruction

== Climate ==
Ellison Bay

Climate chart (precipitation, max. and min. temperature)
J	F	M	A	M	J	J	A	S	O	N	D
42 −3 −11	28 −2 −11	44 3 −6	72 9 0	80 16 6	81 21 12	76 24 15	74 24 15	82 20 11	87 13 6	58 6 0	45 0 −6
- █ Average max. and min. temperatures in °C
- █ Precipitation totals in mm
Imperial conversion
J	F	M	A	M	J	J	A	S	O	N	D
1.6 26 13	1.1 28 13	1.7 37 21	2.8 48 32	3.2 60 43	3.2 70 53	3 76 59	2.9 75 59	3.2 68 53	3.4 55 42	2.3 43 31	1.8 32 22
- █ Average max. and min. temperatures in °F
- █ Precipitation totals in inches

== Gallery ==
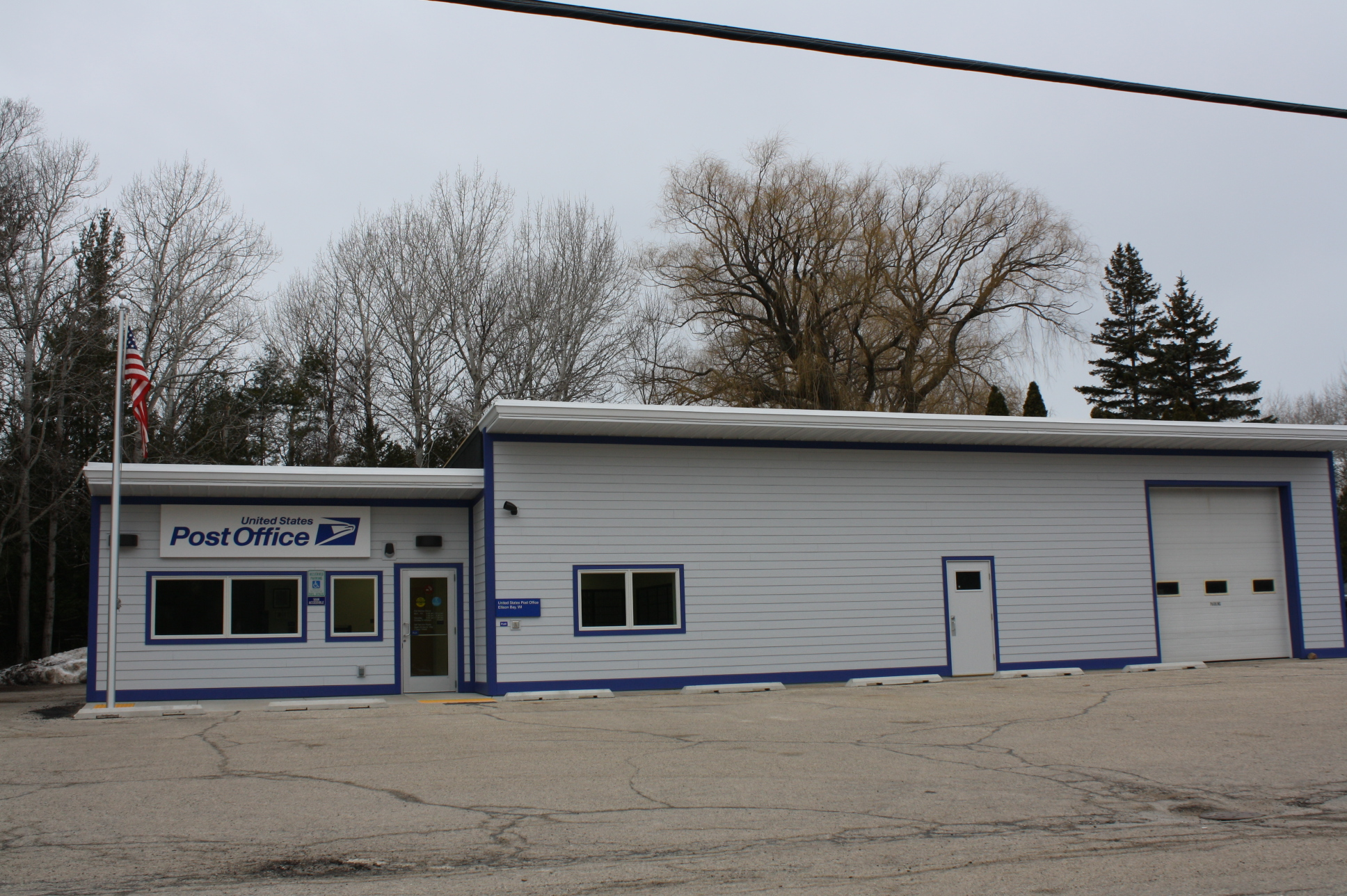
Post office

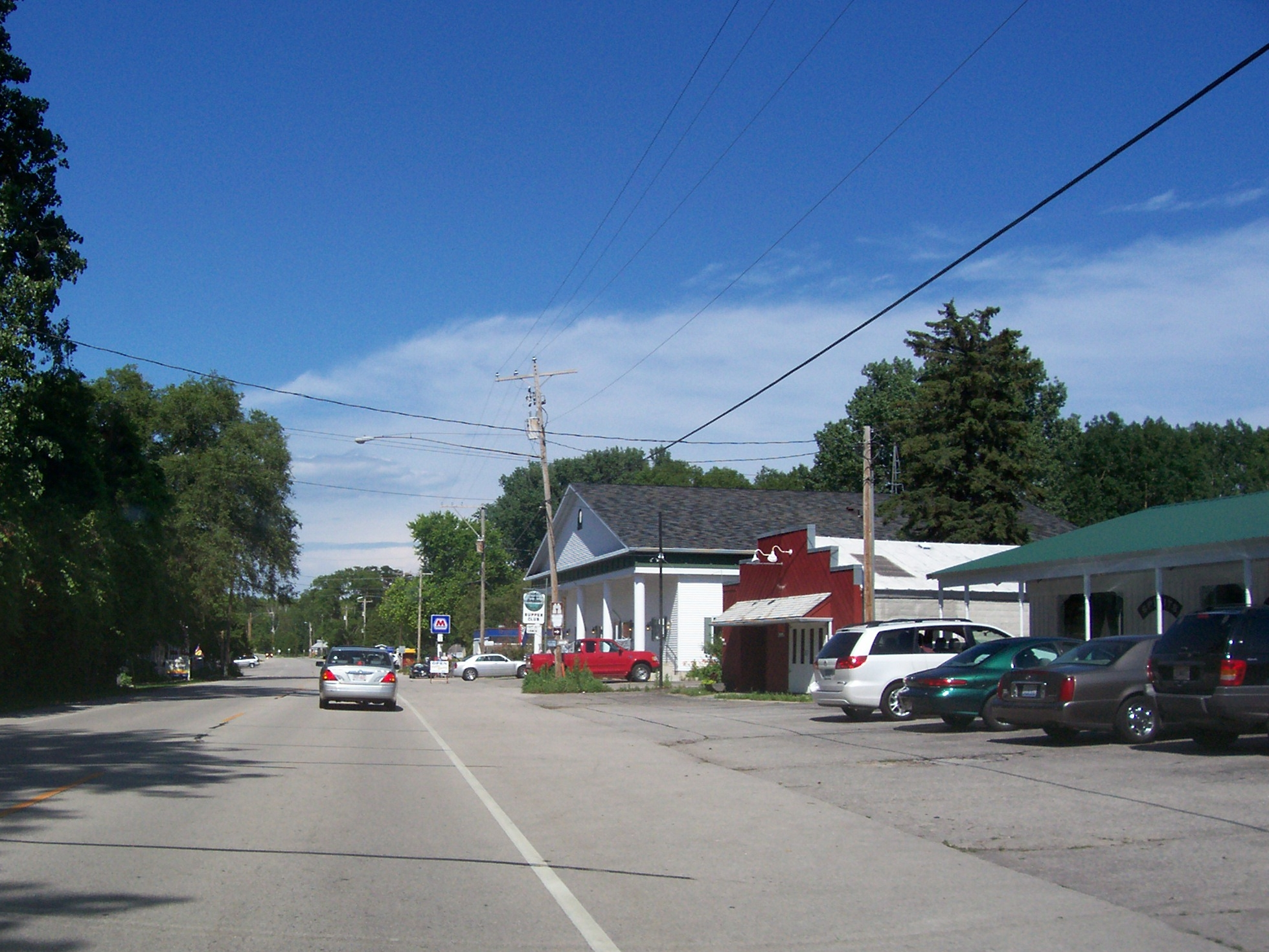
Looking north in downtown Ellison Bay

Northern part of the bay

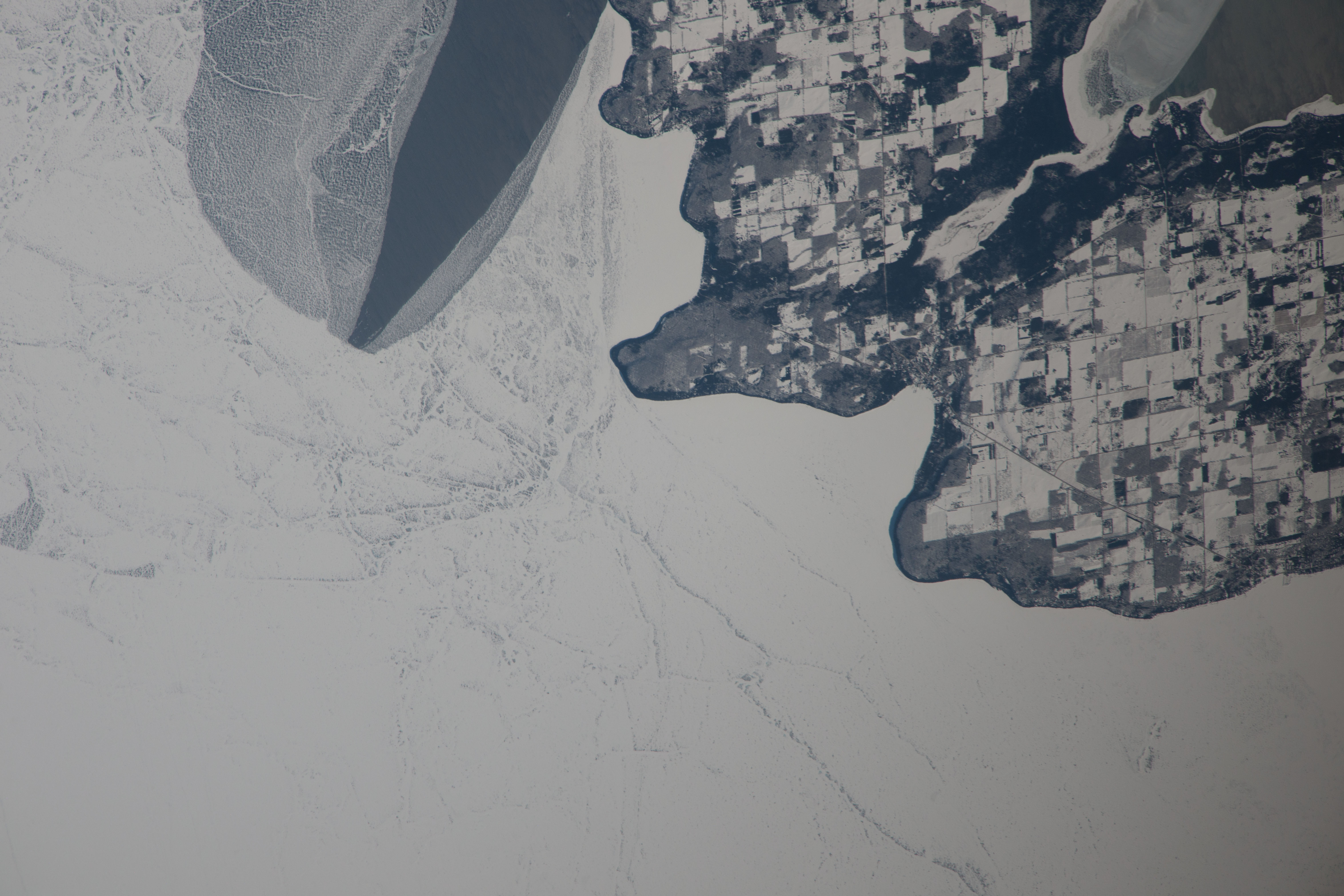
Ellison Bay, below, taken by a crewmember of ISS Expedition 38, February 22, 2014

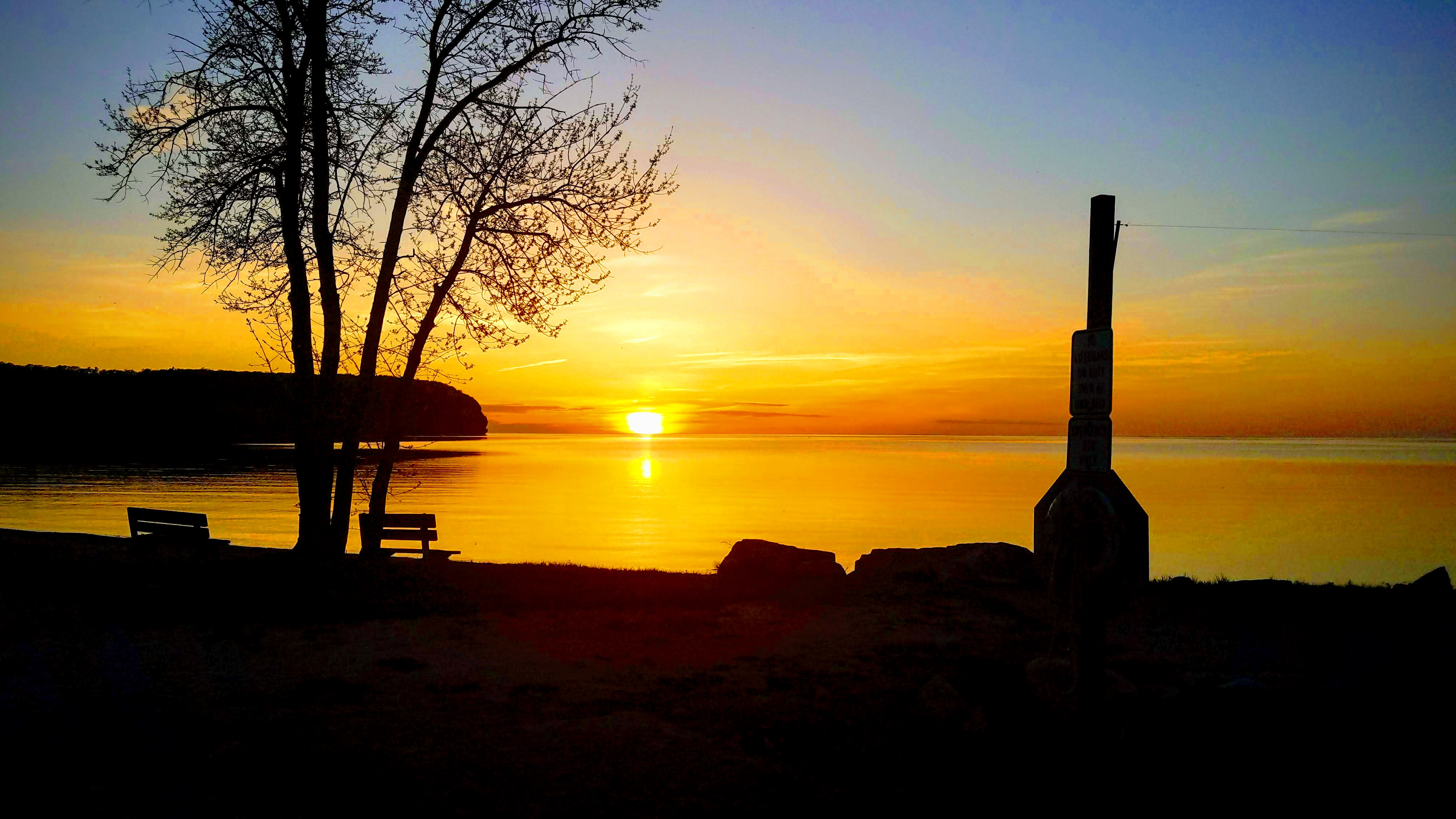
Sunset over the bay

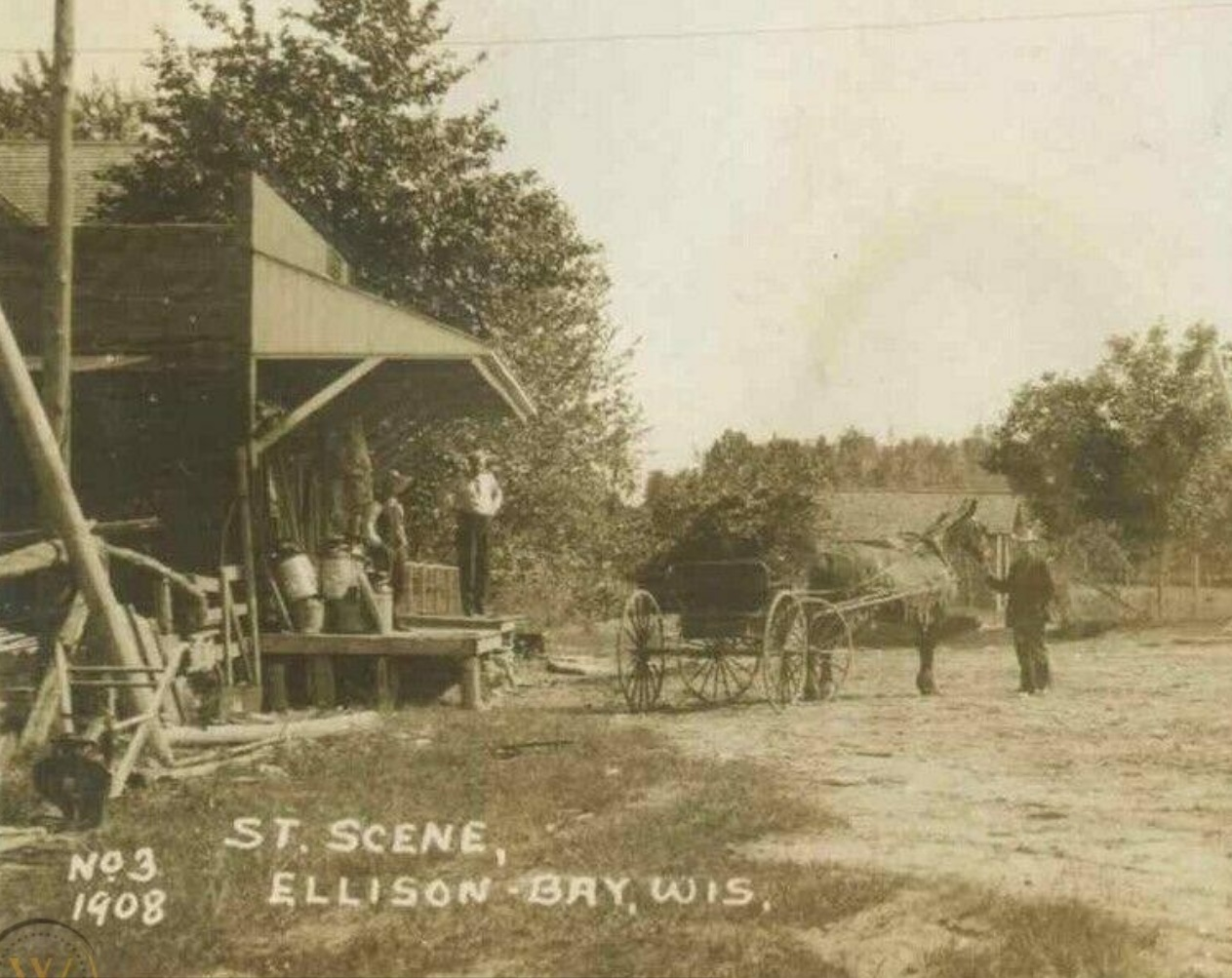
1908 postcard depicting Ellison Bay

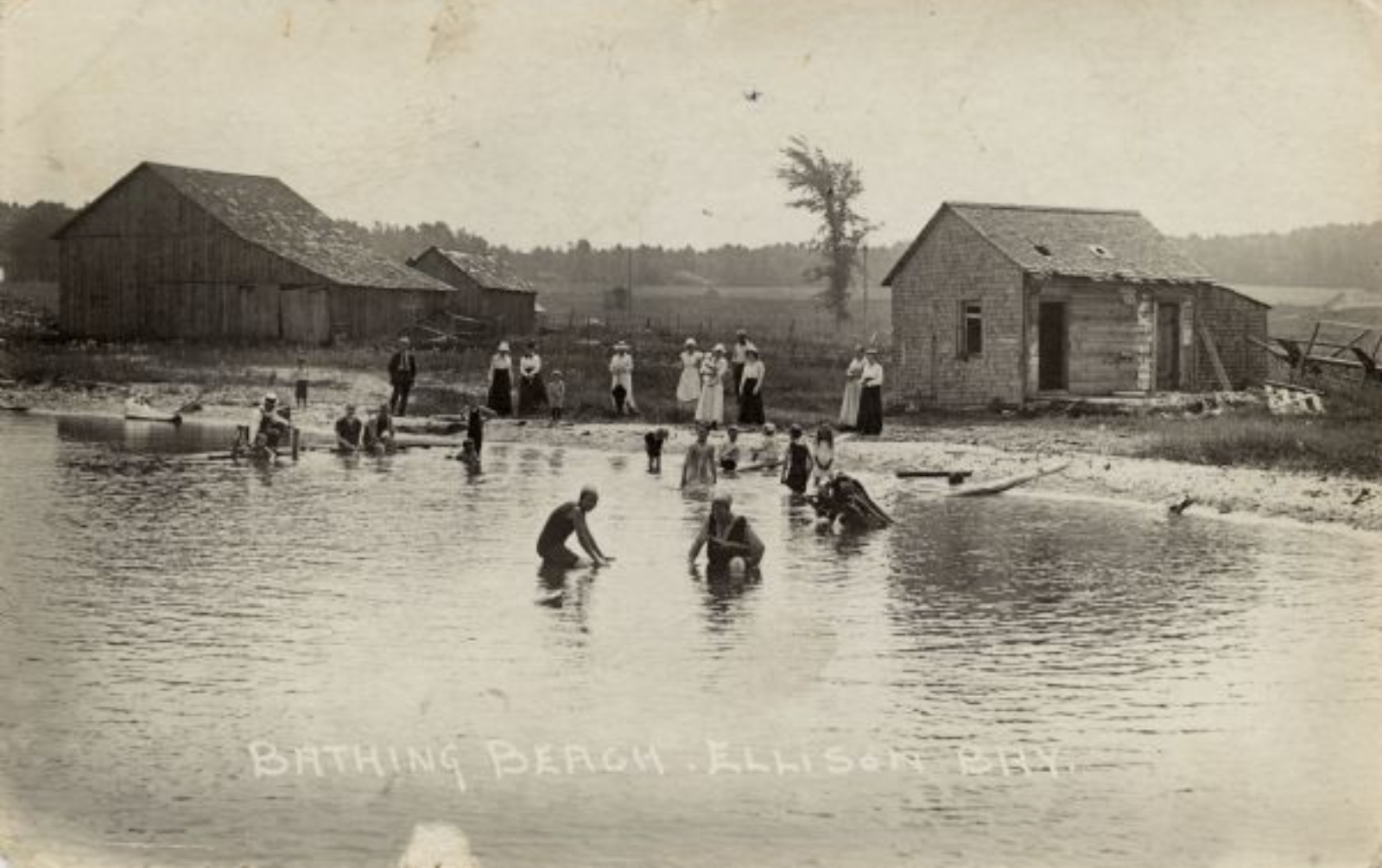
c. 1919 postcard depicting Ellison Bay

== Sources ==
- Around the Shores of Lake Michigan: A Guide to Historic Sites by Margaret Beattie Bogue (1985, University of Wisconsin Press)
