= Foreign policy of the Franklin D. Roosevelt administration =

The foreign policy of the United States was controlled personally by Franklin D. Roosevelt during his first and second and then third and fourth terms as president of the United States from 1933 to 1945. He depended heavily on Henry Morgenthau Jr., Sumner Welles, and Harry Hopkins. Meanwhile, Secretary of State Cordell Hull handled routine matters. Roosevelt was an internationalist, while powerful members of Congress favored more isolationist solutions to keep the U.S. out of European wars. There was considerable tension before the Attack on Pearl Harbor in December 1941. The attack converted the isolationists or made them irrelevant. The US began aid to the Soviet Union after Germany invaded it in June 1941. After the US declared war in December 1941, key decisions were made at the highest level by Roosevelt, Britain's Winston Churchill and the Soviet Union's Joseph Stalin, along with their top aides. After 1938 Washington's policy was to help China in its war against Japan, including cutting off money and oil to Japan. While isolationism was powerful regarding Europe, American public and elite opinion strongly opposed Japan.

The 1930s were a high point of isolationism in the United States. The key foreign policy of Roosevelt's first term was the continuation of Hoover's Good Neighbor policy, in which the U.S. took a non-interventionist stance in Latin American affairs. Foreign policy issues came to the fore in the late 1930s, as Nazi Germany, Japan, and Italy took aggressive actions against other countries. In response to fears that the United States would be drawn into foreign conflicts, Congress passed the Neutrality Acts, a series of laws that prevented trade with belligerents. After Japan invaded China and Germany invaded Poland, Roosevelt provided aid to China, Britain, and France, but public opinion opposed use of the military. After the Fall of France in June 1940, Roosevelt increased aid to the British and began a very rapid buildup of air power. In the 1940 presidential election, Roosevelt defeated Republican Wendell Willkie, an internationalist who largely refrained from criticizing Roosevelt's foreign policy.

Unlike his first two terms in office, Roosevelt's third and fourth terms were dominated by war issues. Roosevelt won congressional approval of the Lend-Lease program, which was designed to aid allies warring against Germany and Japan. After Germany declared war on the Soviet Union, Roosevelt extended Lend-Lease to the Soviet Union as well. In Asia, Roosevelt provided aid to the Republic of China, which was resisting a largely successful invasion by the Japanese. In response to the July 1941 Japanese occupation of southern French Indochina, Roosevelt expanded a trade embargo on Japan. After attempting to reopen oil exports, Japan launched an attack on the U.S. fleet stationed at Pearl Harbor. The United States became belligerent in December 1941 after Congress responded in kind to declarations of war by Japan, Germany, and Italy. The leading Allied Powers were the U.S., Britain, the Soviet Union, and (by courtesy) China. The Allies agreed on a Europe first strategy, but in practice the American war effort focused on Japan before 1943.

Britain and the U.S. began the campaign against Germany with an invasion of North Africa in late 1942, winning decisively in May 1943. Meanwhile, the United States won a decisive victory over Japan in the Battle of Midway and began a campaign of island hopping in the Pacific Ocean. In 1943, the Allies launched an invasion of Italy and continued to pursue the island-hopping strategy. The major Allied leaders met at the Tehran Conference in 1943, where they began to discuss postwar plans. Taking up the Wilsonian mantle, Roosevelt also pushed as his highest postwar priority the establishment of the United Nations to replace the defunct League of Nations. Roosevelt expected it would be controlled by Washington, Moscow, London, and Beijing, and that this Big Four would resolve all major world problems. By the time of Roosevelt's death in April 1945, Germany and Japan were collapsing rapidly. Both soon surrendered and became the responsibility of the Foreign policy of the Harry S. Truman administration.

== First term foreign policy ==
Four basic principles undergirded Roosevelt's foreign policy approach when he took office. As Arthur M. Schlesinger Jr. explains:

One was TR's [Theodore Roosevelt's] belief in the preservation of the balance of world power. A second was Wilson's dream of concerted international action to keep the peace. The third was the conviction that peace and political collaboration rested on commercial harmony among nations and therefore required a freely trading world. The fourth principle was the imperative necessary in a democracy of basing foreign-policy on domestic consent. The first three principles were inevitably qualified and compromised by the fourth.

Having served as the Assistant Secretary of the Navy in World War I, Roosevelt had a deep understanding of naval affairs and knew many of the senior officers. He kept abreast of naval issues and appreciated the doctrines of Alfred Thayer Mahan on the need for naval superiority.

=== Good Neighbor Policy and trade ===
Roosevelt's first inaugural address contained just one sentence devoted to foreign policy, indicative of the domestic focus of his first term. The main foreign policy initiative of Roosevelt's first term was what he called the Good Neighbor Policy, which continued the move begun by Calvin Coolidge and Herbert Hoover toward a non-interventionist policy in Latin America. American forces were withdrawn from Haiti, and a new treaty with Panama ended its status as protectorates, while continuing American control of the Panama Canal Zone. Roosevelt wanted to disengage from Cuba, but his first ambassador, Sumner Welles, became enmeshed in the selection of a Cuban president. By late 1933 Roosevelt had appointed Jefferson Caffrey as the new ambassador. In January 1934 Carlos Mendieta, who was approved by Caffrey, formed a government that was quickly recognized by Washington. The United States then did disengage, and did not protest when it was overthrown by Fulgencio Batista in 1934.

In December 1933, Roosevelt signed the Montevideo Convention on the Rights and Duties of States, renouncing the right to intervene unilaterally in the affairs of Latin American countries. After the withdrawal of U.S. forces from Haiti, the only U.S. military forces remaining in the Caribbean were stationed in the Panama Canal Zone and the Guantanamo Bay Naval Base. In 1934, Congress enacted Cordell Hull's key program, the Reciprocal Tariff Act. It allowed the president to negotiate trade reciprocity treaties with other countries. Over the next six years, the U.S. signed agreements with 21 countries, primarily in Latin America. resulting in a significant reduction of tariff levels. Thanks to the reciprocal tariffs and the new Export–Import Bank, trade between the U.S. and Latin America more than tripled between 1931 and 1941.

==== Mexico ====
During the presidency of Mexico's revolutionary general Lázaro Cárdenas del Río, controversy over petroleum arose again. Standard Oil had major investments in Mexico and a dispute between the oil workers and the company was to be resolved via the Mexican court system. But the dispute escalated, and on March 18, 1938, Cárdenas used constitutional powers to expropriate foreign oil interests in Mexico and created the government-owned Petroleos Mexicanos (PEMEX). With unemployment very high during the Great Depression in the United States, Washington implemented a program of expelling Mexicans from the U.S. in what was known as Mexican Repatriation.

Under President Cárdenas, in 1934-40 Mexico expropriated three million acres of agricultural land owned by 300 Americans. Its worth was a matter of debate: between $19 million and $102 million, but nothing was paid. Roosevelt settled the matter in 1938 quietly. He refused to aggressively intervene in Mexican agrarian disputes in order not to disrupt trade. He was sympathetic to Cárdenas's agrarian reform program, as was ambassador Josephus Daniels, but Secretary Hull was antagonistic. American Catholics—a major component of the New Deal coalition—were outraged at anti-Catholicism in Mexico. Ambassador Daniels worked quietly to convince the Mexican government it was essential that they minimize the conflict. Finally, in 1941, Mexico agreed to pay $40 million for American land losses in the 1910s, not including the oil issue.

After Pearl Harbor, relations became much better. Mexico abandoned its neutrality. The two nations set up a Mexico-United States Defense Board that focused on defending the Baja California peninsula against Japanese threats. On June 1, 1942, Mexico declared war on Germany, Italy and Japan. In August, the Bracero program began, and the first 75,000 farmworkers arrived in California at the end of September. A steady flow provided the labor needed to expand California's agricultural output to meet wartime demands. Other problems were resolved, such as a long conflict over the water of the Colorado River, with a February 1944 treaty that met Mexico's water needs.

=== Recognition of the Soviet Union ===
By the late 1920s, the Soviet Union was no longer a pariah in European affairs, and had normal diplomatic and trade relations with most countries. By 1933, old American fears of Communist threats had faded, and the business community, as well as newspaper editors, were calling for diplomatic recognition. Roosevelt was eager for large-scale trade with the Soviet Union, and hoped for some repayment on the old tsarist debts. After the Soviets promised they would not engage in espionage, Roosevelt used presidential authority to normalize relations in 1933. There were few complaints about the move. But there was no progress on the debt issue, and the Kremlin set up an active espionage program. Many American businesses had expected a bonus in terms of large-scale trade, but it never materialized. Historians Justus D. Doenecke and Mark A. Stoler note, "Both nations were soon disillusioned by the accord."

=== Isolationism ===
==== Rejection of the World Court ====
The U.S., played a major role in setting up "the Permanent Court of International Justice", known as the World Court. Presidents Wilson, Harding, Coolidge, and Hoover supported membership but were unable to get a 2/3 majority in the Senate for a treaty. Roosevelt also supported membership, but did not make it a high priority. Opposition was intense on the issue of losing sovereignty, led by the Hearst newspapers and Father Charles Coughlin. The U.S. never joined. The World Court was replaced by the International Court of Justice in 1945, but the Connally Amendment of 1944 reserved the right of the United States to refuse to abide by its decisions. Margaret A. Rague argues this reduced the Court's strength, discredited America's image as a proponent of international law, and exemplified the problems created by vesting a reservation power in the Senate.

==== Neutrality laws block response to aggression ====
Roosevelt took office a few weeks after Hitler did in Germany and quickly recognized the aggressive nature of the new Nazi regime. He instructed the US representative to Geneva to say that if there was a threat to peace the US was willing to cooperate with collective efforts made by other states to restore peace. But Congress immediately rejected this initiative by requiring that any embargo on arms shipments to aggressor nations had to apply equally to victims of aggression. The neutrality laws of the mid-1930s forbade the president to discriminate between aggressor and victim, which effectively prevented Roosevelt from acting against aggression. When Congress rejected his proposal to join the World Court, he commented, "Today, quite frankly, the wind everywhere blows against us."

The 1930s marked the high point of American isolationism. The country had a long tradition of non-interventionism, but isolationists in the 1930s sought to keep the U.S. out of world affairs to an unprecedented degree. Isolationist sentiment stemmed from a desire to focus on domestic issues, bitterness over World War I and unpaid war debts, and fears that bankers (many of them Jewish like the Rothschilds) and munitions makers intrigued to involve the United States in European wars in order to make profits. Public opinion showed a strong detachment from, and reluctance to become involved in, the growing crises in Europe. Responding to the country's isolationist mood, Roosevelt in the 1930s never mentioned his previous support for joining the League of Nations. Learning from Wilson's mistakes, Roosevelt avoided provoking isolationist sentiment. He was especially reluctant to clash with progressive Republican senators like George Norris, Robert La Follette, Hiram Johnson, and William Borah, all of whom provided support for his domestic programs, while demanding he follow isolationism. The isolationist movement dramatically publicized its conspiracy theories in 1934–36 through hearings by the Nye Committee of Congress, which investigated the role of business interests in pushing the US into World War I.

=== Naval expansion ===
Roosevelt, as Assistant Secretary of the Navy, had been in effect in civilian control of the Navy during World War I. He knew many senior officers, and strongly supported naval expansion. The Vinson-Trammell Act of 1934 set up a regular program of shipbuilding and modernization to bring the Navy to the maximum size allowed by treaty. The naval limitation treaties also applied to bases, but Congress approved building seaplane bases only on Wake Island, Midway Island, and Dutch Harbor, rejecting additional funds for bases on Guam and the Philippines. Navy ships were designed with greater endurance and range, allowing them to operate further from bases and between refits.

The United States Navy had a presence in the Far East with a major naval base in the US-owned Philippines and a few small river gunboats in China on the Yangtze River. On December 12, 1937, the gunboat USS Panay was bombed and machine-gunned by Imperial Japanese Army Air Service airplanes. Washington quickly accepted Japan's apologies and compensation.

The Naval Act of 1936 authorized the first new battleship since 1921, and USS North Carolina was laid down in October 1937. The Second Vinson Act authorized a 20% increase in the size of the Navy, and in June 1940 the Two-Ocean Navy Act authorized an 11% expansion in the Navy. Chief of Naval Operations Harold Rainsford Stark asked for another 70% increase, amounting to about 200 additional ships, which was authorized by Congress in less than a month. In September 1940, the Destroyers for Bases Agreement gave Britain much-needed destroyers—of WWI vintage—in exchange for United States use of British bases.

=== Worsening international situation ===
The Great Depression of the 1930s saw global economic hardships, a sharp decline in trade and a widespread retreat of democracy. Instead there was a sharp rise in authoritarian governments, economic autarchy, and aggressive threats, especially from Germany and Japan. The American response was a retreat from international political, economic and military involvement.

In 1931, the Empire of Japan invaded Manchuria and established the puppet state of Manchukuo. The Japanese dispatched hundreds of thousands of colonists to Manchukuo, which possessed raw materials and agricultural resources that were in short supply in Japan. The United States and the League of Nations both condemned the invasion, but none of the great powers made any move to evict Japan from the region, and the Japanese appeared poised to further expand their empire. In a direct challenge to the Western powers, Japan proclaimed the Amau doctrine, which stated that Japan alone held responsibility for maintaining order in East Asia. In 1933, Adolf Hitler and the Nazi Party came to power in Germany. At first, many in the United States thought of Hitler as something of a comic figure, but Hitler quickly consolidated his power and attacked the postwar order established by the Treaty of Versailles. He preached a racist doctrine of Aryan superiority, and his central foreign policy goal was the acquisition of territory to Germany's east, which he sought to repopulate with Germans.

Foreign affairs became a more prominent issue by 1935. Italy, under a fascist regime led by Benito Mussolini, invaded Ethiopia, earning international condemnation. In response, Congress passed the first of a series of Neutrality Acts. The Neutrality Act of 1935 required Roosevelt to impose an arms embargo on all belligerents in any given foreign war, without any discretion left to the president. Though he privately opposed the Neutrality Act of 1935 and its successors, Roosevelt signed the bills to preserve his political capital for his domestic agenda. In 1936, Germany and Japan signed the Anti-Comintern Pact, though they never coordinated their strategies. That same year, Germany and Italy formed a weak alliance through the Rome-Berlin Axis agreement. Roosevelt saw the threat these rising powers posed, but focused instead on reviving the U.S. economy during the early part of his presidency. Hitler and other world leaders, meanwhile, believed that the U.S. would be reluctant to intervene in world affairs. They saw the U.S. withdrawal from Latin America, the Neutrality Acts, and the 1934 Tydings–McDuffie Act, which promised independence to the Philippines after a ten-year transition period, as indicative of the strength of isolationism in the United States.

In July 1936, civil war broke out in Spain between the left-wing Republican government and right-wing Nationalist rebels led by General Francisco Franco. Britain and France remained neutral and worked to get the major powers to agree to an arms embargo on both sides. In solidarity with them, Roosevelt recommended to Congress a nondiscriminatory arms embargo in January 1937, and won near-unanimous approval. Though privately supportive of the Republicans, Roosevelt feared the Spanish crisis might escalate to a full-scale European war and cooperated with the other democracies to contain the conflict. He also did not want to alienate American Catholics, a key element of his coalition; Catholic leaders were mostly pro-Franco. By spring 1938, as it was clear that Hitler and Mussolini were aiding Franco, Roosevelt was considering a plan to secretly sell American warplanes to the Spanish government, but nothing came of it. As the Nationalists were on the road to victory in early 1939, Roosevelt called the embargo a mistake. Britain and France recognized Franco's regime on February 27, 1939, and Roosevelt followed on April 1, days after Franco achieved full victory with the capture of Madrid.

=== War clouds ===
Territorial control in the Western Pacific Rim in 1939

The inability of the League of Nations or anyone else to stop the Italian invasion of Ethiopia emboldened Japan and Germany to pursue their territorial ambitions. After the Marco Polo Bridge Incident, Japan invaded China in July 1937, capturing Chinese capital of Nanjing (or Nanking) before the end of the year. The Nanking Massacre and the USS Panay incident both outraged Americans, many of whom favored China due to American Christian missionaries and cultural works like The Good Earth, but the Neutrality Acts blocked arms sales to China. In a reflection of the continuing strength of isolationism, the Ludlow Amendment, which would have required a national referendum for any declaration of war, was only narrowly defeated in the House. Roosevelt gained world attention with his October 1937 Quarantine Speech, which called for an international "quarantine" against the "epidemic of world lawlessness." He did not at this point seek sanctions against Japan, but he did begin strategic planning to build long-range submarines that could blockade Japan.

In 1936, Germany remilitarized the Rhineland in defiance of the Treaty of Versailles. Without the support of Britain or Italy, France declined to intervene to prevent the remilitarization. In March 1938, Germany peacefully annexed Austria. The same year, Germany demanded the annexation of the Sudetenland, the German-speaking parts of Czechoslovakia. In a last desperate effort to keep the peace, Britain and France agreed to German demands with the September 1938 Munich Agreement. Roosevelt supported Britain and France, and insisted on American neutrality in Europe. In March 1939, Hitler flouted the Munich Agreement by occupying the remaining portions of Czechoslovakia. In response, the British announced their commitment to defending Poland, which many assumed Hitler would attack next.

After the Munich Agreement, Roosevelt began to prepare for imminent war. He called for the revision of the Neutrality Act in his 1939 State of the Union Address, but his proposal was defeated in both houses of Congress. He ordered a massive increase in aircraft production, with a concentration on long-range bombers, especially the Boeing B-17 Flying Fortress.

=== Relations with France ===
In the 1930s, diplomatic relations between the United States and France were minimal. The United States did not figure in French plans until 1938. The embassies had little business beyond assisting tourists and businessmen, and there was practically no high-level activity. French foreign policy was very busy with the growth of Nazi Germany after 1933, putting to a severe test the French policy of forming military alliances with Germany's smaller neighbors, such as Czechoslovakia and Poland. In dramatic contrast the United States basked in complete security. President Hoover set up a world economic conference in 1933 to come up with international solutions to the depression, but Roosevelt torpedoed it by rejecting any possible recommendations. As the United States moved into an almost complete isolation from European affairs, Nazi Germany was extremely unpopular across the United States, because of its antisemitism, its will to conquest, its aggression, and its dismantling of liberal democratic features to create a totalitarian state. But there was no thought of going to war in Europe. Charles Lindbergh was the hero of the hour and a strong spokesman for the notion that a powerful Air Force would always protect the United States, but the Atlantic was too wide for the bombers of the day. American land forces were minimal and remained so until 1940. Efforts at innovation in the Army were rejected; for example, the tank corps that had been active in World War I was deactivated. France was outraged by Hitler's repeated rejection of the Versailles Treaty limitations on German armaments. France poured its money into the Maginot Line, a vast defensive system that covered France's border with Germany, but not its border with neutral Belgium. (In 1940 Germany maneuvered around the Maginot line and invaded France through Belgium.) France expanded its alliance system by adding the Soviet Union and edging closer to Fascist Italy and especially the United Kingdom. In 1938 France and Britain sacrificed Czechoslovakia to appease Nazi aggression through the Munich Agreement. Meanwhile, in the Spanish Civil War, Germany was demonstrating the superiority of its Luftwaffe, while giving its pilots combat experience.

France suddenly became aware of its drastic inferiority in airpower—Germany had better warplanes, more of them, pilots with combat experience, and much bigger and more efficient factories. Paris made an enormous effort to catch up by expanding its military budget, giving priority to aviation, standardizing its models, building new factories, and making overseas purchases. France expected to be powerful in the air by 1941, and in combination with Britain, to have more airpower than Germany by then. In late 1937 Paris sent to Washington a personal friend of Roosevelt, Senator Baron Amaury de La Grange. He told Roosevelt about the French weaknesses, and urgently asked for help. Roosevelt was never an isolationist, strongly opposed Nazi Germany, and was eager to help France. He also realized that a large French order would greatly speed up the expansion of the American aircraft industry. Roosevelt forced the War Department to secretly sell France the most modern American airplanes. Paris frantically expanded its own aircraft production, but it was too little and too late. France and Britain declared war on Germany in September 1939, but there was little action on the Western Front until the following spring. Suddenly a German blitzkrieg overwhelmed Denmark and Norway and trapped French and British forces in Belgium. France was forced to accept German terms and Philippe Pétain's pro-fascist dictatorship took over in Vichy France. Only 200 of the 555 American aircraft ordered had arrived in France by June 1940, so Roosevelt arranged for the remaining planes to be sold to the British.

=== World War II begins in Europe ===
World War II began in September 1939 with Germany's invasion of Poland, as France and Britain declared war in response. Western leaders were stunned when the Soviet Union invaded Poland and split control of Poland with Germany. The two hostile powers had reached a non-aggression pact in August 1939, which contained a secret protocol for the partition of Poland. Though few Americans wanted to intervene in the war, an October 1939 Gallup poll showed that over 80 percent of the country favored Britain and France over Germany. Per the terms of the Neutrality Act, Roosevelt recognized a state of war in Europe, imposing an arms embargo on France, Britain, and Germany. Days later, he called Congress into a special session to revise the Neutrality Act. Overcoming the opposition of Lindbergh and other isolationists, in 1939 Roosevelt won passage of the Neutrality Act, which allowed belligerents to purchase aircraft and other combat material from the United States, albeit only on a cash and carry basis. Though the United States remained officially neutral until December 1941, Roosevelt continued to seek ways to assist Britain and France.

During the so-called "Phony War," a period of inactivity in Western Europe after the conclusion of the invasion of Poland, Roosevelt tried to negotiate a peace, but Hitler was uninterested. Japan, meanwhile, grew increasingly assertive in the Pacific, demanding that the French and British colonies close their borders with China. Beginning in September 1939, Roosevelt forged a close personal relationship with Winston Churchill, who became the British prime minister in May 1940. Germany invaded Denmark and Norway in April 1940 and invaded the Low Countries and France in May. As France's situation grew increasingly desperate, Churchill and French Prime Minister Paul Reynaud appealed to Roosevelt for American entry into the war, but Roosevelt was still unwilling to challenge the isolationist sentiment in the United States. With France on the verge of surrender, Italy also launched an invasion of France. France surrendered on June 22, resulting in the division of France into a German-controlled zone and a partially occupied area known Vichy France.

With the fall of France, Britain and its dominions became the lone major force at war with Germany. Roosevelt, who was determined to stay out of the war even if Britain was defeated, considered the shift of public opinion; the fall of Paris led to a rise in isolationist sentiment as observed by the contemporaries, though later historiographies attempt to find a decline in this sentiment. In July 1940, 90% of Americans wanted America to stay out of the war. Roosevelt defeated his interventionist opponent in the 1940 presidential election, Wendell Willkie, by an overwhelming margin. Public opinion remained highly isolationist until May 1941, when 80% were against the entry into the war and third of the polled still supported the clear isolationism. Radio coverage of the Battle of Britain, an aerial campaign in which Germany attempted to air superiority and bombed British targets, galvanized American public opinion behind Britain but definitely short of war. Overcoming the opposition of much of the military establishment, who doubted Britain's ability to remain in the war against Germany, Roosevelt pursued policies designed to maximize arms transfers to Britain and, overcoming the opposition of much of the government, rejected the convoy escort across the Atlantic for one more year. In July 1940, Roosevelt appointed two interventionist Republican leaders, Henry L. Stimson and Frank Knox, as Secretaries of War and the Navy, respectively. Both parties supported his plans for a rapid buildup of the military, but Roosevelt himself sided with the isolationists in not getting the nation into a war with Germany. Consequently, both Stimson and Knox the following year were disappointed, puzzled, and "shocked" by FDR's isolationist line, or "failure of leadership," as they called it. The military buildup and the British purchase of armaments had a beneficial effect on the economy, and the unemployment rate fell to 14.6% in late 1940.

On September 2, 1940, Roosevelt defied the spirit of the Neutrality Acts in reaching the Destroyers for Bases Agreement. In exchange for the use of British military bases in the Caribbean Islands, the U.S. transferred 50 old World War I American destroyers, which were to be used to defend against German submarines. The destroyers had relatively little military importance, but the deal represented a symbolic American commitment to Britain. Later in September, with the backing of both major-party presidential candidates, Congress authorized the nation's first peacetime draft. Hitler and Mussolini responded to the Destroyers for Bases Agreement by joining with Japan in the Tripartite Pact, and the three countries became known as the Axis powers. The Tripartite Act was specifically designed to intimidate the United States into remaining neutral in the Sino-Japanese War and the war in Europe.

As Roosevelt took a firmer stance against the Axis Powers, American isolationists like Lindbergh and America First vehemently attacked him as an irresponsible warmonger. In turn they were denounced as antisemitic dupes of the Nazis. Reviewer Richard S. Faulkner paraphrases Lynne Olson in arguing that "Lindbergh was far from the simple anti-Semite and pro-Nazi dupe that the Roosevelt administration and pro-intervention press often portrayed him to be, but was rather a man whose technical and clinical mind had him convinced that Britain could not win the war and America's lack of military preparedness meant that intervention was immoral, illogical, and suicidal."

== Prelude to war: 1941 ==
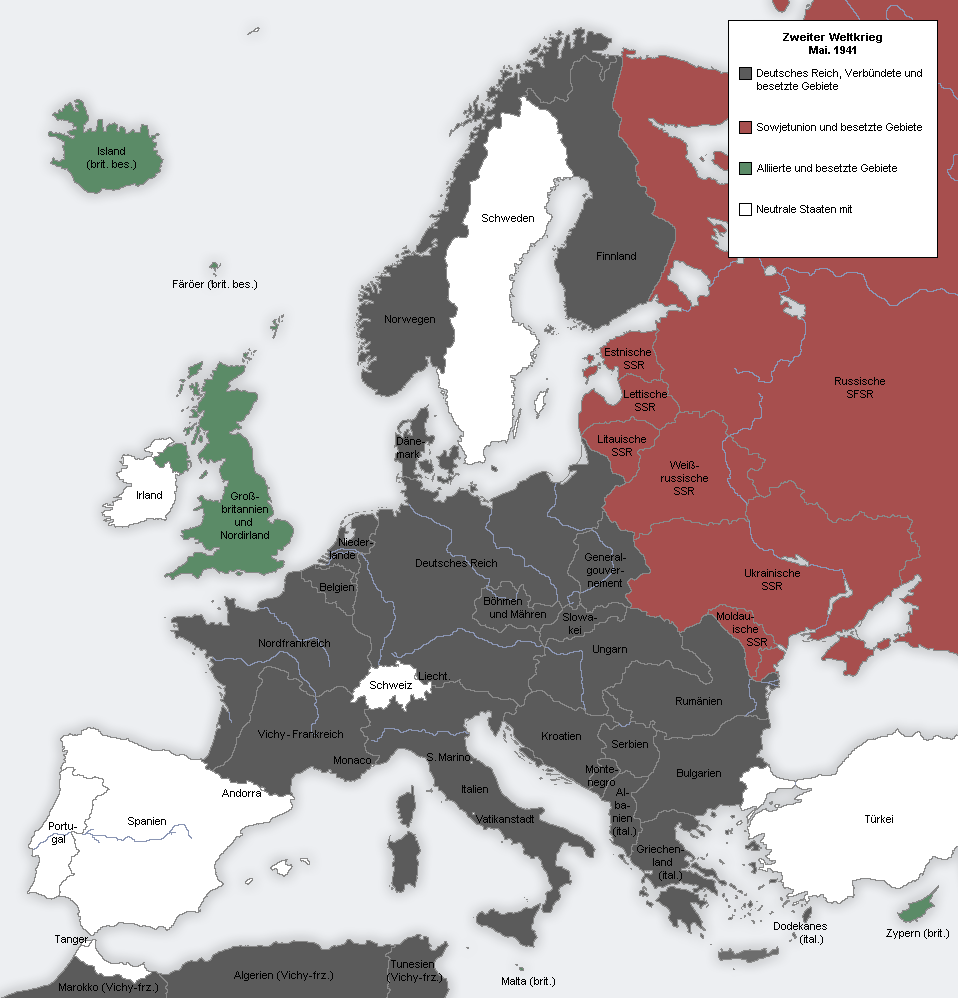
The geopolitical disposition of Europe in 1941. The grey area represents Nazi Germany, its allies, and countries under its firm control.

After his reelection in 1940, the world war dominated FDR's attention, with far more time devoted to world affairs than ever before. Domestic politics and relations with Congress were largely shaped by his efforts to achieve total mobilization of the nation's economic, financial, and institutional resources for the war effort. Even relationships with Latin America and Canada were structured by wartime demands. Roosevelt maintained tight personal control of all major diplomatic and military decisions, working closely with his generals and admirals, the war and Navy departments, Churchill and the British, and even with the Soviet Union. His key advisors on diplomacy were Harry Hopkins (who was based in the White House), Sumner Welles (based in the State Department), and Henry Morgenthau Jr. at Treasury. In military affairs FDR worked most closely with Secretary Henry L. Stimson at the War Department, Army Chief of Staff George Marshall, and Admiral William D. Leahy.

=== Intelligence and espionage ===
Roosevelt had long been interested in intelligence, but the U.S. in the 1930s lacked spy agencies comparable to European ones. The small intelligence services of the Army, Navy, and State Departments did not cooperate with one another. According to British historian Donald Cameron Watt, Roosevelt browsed and trusted a variety of sources, including the French Deuxième Bureau; the Polish Intelligence bureau; snippets from the German opposition to Hitler; selected items passed by British Intelligence; journalist reports; and "The Week", a British newsletter edited by Claud Cockburn, a Communist journalist. This left an opening for the British to supply Roosevelt with fake documents indicating the Germans were planning to build up their power in Latin America. Roosevelt believed the falsehoods he was fed, and made defense of Latin America against Germany a high priority. During the war, he set up a new agency, the Office of Strategic Services (OSS), headed by an old personal friend, William J. Donovan. OSS engaged in numerous espionage operations and sabotage efforts against Germany and played a minor role in support of the Chinese theater. It was shut down at the end of the war, and partly reassembled later in the Central Intelligence Agency. Roosevelt appointed one of his original brain trusters, Adolf A. Berle, to a senior position in the State Department coordinating intelligence. FDR now relied on daily briefings from Army and Navy intelligence, and also paid attention to reports from the Office of War Information and from J. Edgar Hoover's FBI. Meanwhile, none of his agencies realized the scope of Soviet spying during the war. The agencies were feuding with each other, demonstrating a weakness in Roosevelt's decision to be his own coordinator of information.

=== Early 1941 ===
After defeating Wendell Willkie in the 1940 presidential election, Roosevelt embarked on a public campaign to win congressional support for aid to the British. In December 1940, he received a letter from Churchill asking the U.S. to repeal the Neutrality Act's cash and carry provision. With British forces committed to defending against Germany, Churchill asked the U.S. to provide loans and shipping for American goods. In response, Roosevelt delivered a speech in which he called for the United States to be the "Arsenal of Democracy", supplying aid to those resisting Germany and other aggressors. He said, "if Great Britain goes down, the Axis Powers will control the continents of Europe, Asia, Africa, Australasia, and the high seas–and they will be in a position to bring enormous military and naval resources against this hemisphere."

In his January 1941 Four Freedoms speech, Roosevelt laid out the case for an American defense of basic rights throughout the world. In the same speech, he asked Congress to approve a Lend-Lease program designed to provide military aid to Britain. With Willkie's backing, the Lend-Lease bill passed both houses of Congress by large margins, with most of the opposition from Midwestern Republicans. But isolationists did prevent the U.S. from providing naval escorts to merchant ships heading to Britain. Roosevelt also requested, and Congress granted, a major boost in military expenditures. With this boost in spending, the unemployment rate dropped below 10% for the first time in over a decade. To oversee mobilization efforts, Roosevelt created the Office of Production Management, the Office of Price Administration and Civilian Supply, and the Supply Priorities and Allocations Board.

In late 1940, Admiral Harold Stark sent Roosevelt the Plan Dog memo, which set forth four strategic war plans for fighting an anticipated two-front war against Japan and Germany. Of the four strategies, Stark advocated the so-called "Plan Dog", which contemplated a Europe first strategy and avoidance of conflict with Japan for as long as possible. A key part of this strategy was to ensure that Britain remained in the fight against Germany until the U.S., potentially with other countries' help, could launch a land offensive into Europe. Roosevelt did not publicly commit to Plan Dog, but it motivated him to launch talks between U.S. and British military staff, codenamed "ABC–1". In early 1941, U.S. and British military planners jointly agreed to pursue a Europe first strategy. In July, Roosevelt ordered Secretary of War Stimson to begin planning for total American military involvement. The resulting "Victory Program" provided the army's estimates of the mobilization of manpower, industry, and logistics necessary to defeat Germany and Japan. The program planned to dramatically increase aid to the Allied nations and to prepare a force of ten million men in arms, half of whom would be ready for deployment abroad in 1943.

When Germany invaded the Soviet Union in June 1941, Roosevelt agreed to extend Lend-Lease to the Soviets. Thus he had committed the U.S. to the Allied side with a policy of "all aid short of war." Some Americans were reluctant to aid the Soviet Union, but Roosevelt believed the Soviets would be indispensable in defeating Germany. Execution of the aid fell victim to foot dragging in the administration, so FDR appointed a special assistant, Wayne Coy, to expedite matters.

=== Late 1941 ===
In February 1941, Hitler refocused the war against Britain from air operations to naval operations, specifically U-boat (German submarine) raids against convoys headed to Britain. In response, Churchill requested that the United States provide convoy escorts, but Roosevelt was still reluctant to challenge anti-war sentiment. In May, German Kriegsmarine submarines sank the SS Robin Moor, an American freighter, but Roosevelt declined to use the incident as a pretext to increase the navy's role in the Atlantic. Meanwhile, the Axis Powers had success in their campaigns against the Soviet Union, Yugoslavia, Greece, and British forces in North Africa.

In August 1941, Roosevelt and Churchill conducted a top-secret meeting in Argentia, Newfoundland. This meeting announced to the world the Atlantic Charter, which conceptually outlined global wartime and postwar goals. Each leader pledged to support democracy, free trade, and principles of non-aggression. Whether self-determination applied to the British colonies became highly controversial.

Naval confrontations escalated in the North Atlantic, as German U-boats tried to sink British ships while avoiding contact with the U.S. Navy. American destroyers started hunting and tracking German submarines, passing information to the British Royal Navy, which tried to sink them. Roosevelt insisted that American actions were defensive, as isolationists denounced a deceitful plan to go to war.

On 4 September 1941 an American destroyer, the USS Greer (DD-145), which was carrying mail and passengers to Allied-occupied Iceland, tracked a German submarine but did not fire on it. The German U-boat U-652 fired two torpedoes at the Greer, which evaded them. Neither warship was damaged. In response, Roosevelt announced a new policy whereby the U.S. would attack German or Italian ships that entered U.S. naval zones. This "shoot on sight" policy effectively declared naval war on Germany and was favored by Americans by a margin of 2 to 1. This episode did not escalate into all-out war because both Hitler and Roosevelt were very cautious. Hitler needed to devote all his military resources to his invasion of the Soviet Union, and Roosevelt wanted to build up public support for an aggressive policy to control the North Atlantic. Roosevelt sent the military to establish American bases in Greenland and Iceland. Seeking to head off a possible German invasion, the Roosevelt administration increased military, commercial, and cultural engagement with Latin America.

In October 1941, the USS Kearny, along with other ships, engaged a number of U-boats south of Iceland; the Kearny took fire and lost eleven crewmen. After the attack, Congress amended the Neutrality Act to allow American merchant ships to transport war supplies to Britain, effectively repealing the last provision of the cash and carry policy. But neither the Kearny incident nor an attack on the USS Reuben James changed public opinion as much as Roosevelt hoped they might.

=== War threatens in the Pacific ===
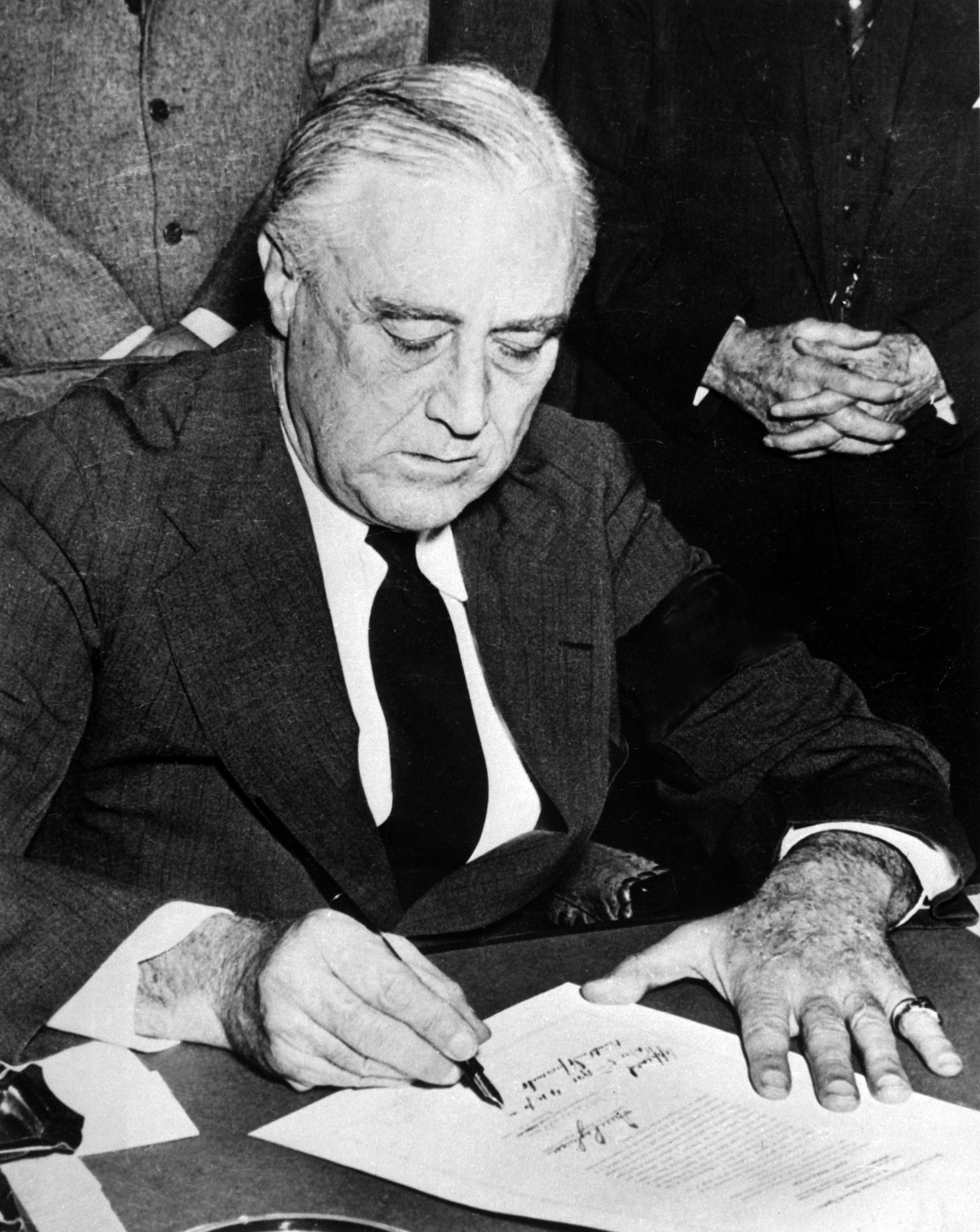
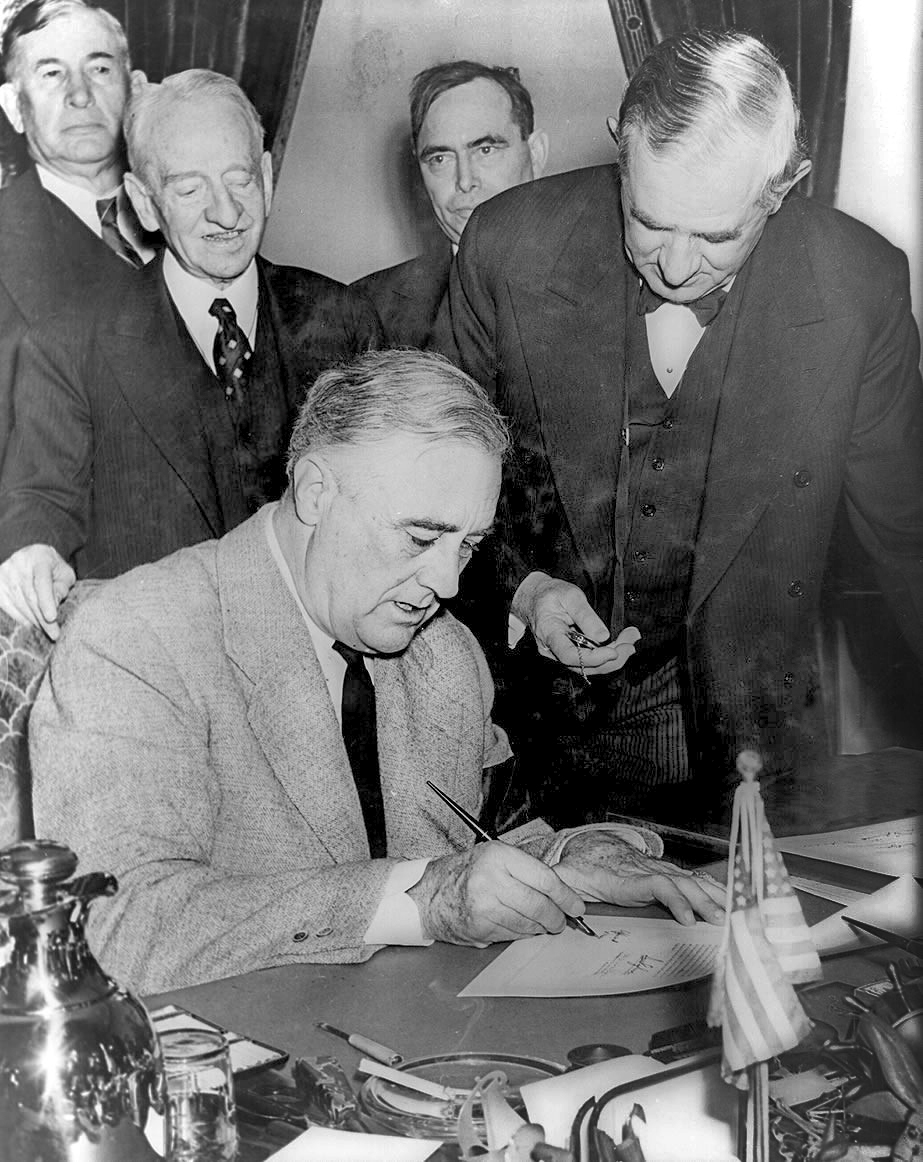
Roosevelt signing declaration of war against Japan (left) on December 8 and against Germany (right) on December 11, 1941.

By 1940, Japan had conquered much of the Chinese coast and major river valleys but had been unable to defeat either the Nationalist government of Chiang Kai-shek or the Communist forces under Mao Zedong. Though Japan's government was nominally led by the civilian government of Prime Minister Fumimaro Konoye, Minister of War Hideki Tojo and other military leaders held immense power. At Tojo's insistence, Japan moved to take control of lightly defended European colonies in Southeast Asia, which provided important resources as well as a conduit of supply to Chinese forces. When Japan occupied northern French Indochina in late 1940, Roosevelt authorized increased aid to the Republic of China, a policy that won widespread popular support. He also implemented a partial embargo on Japan, preventing the export of iron and steel. Over the next year, the Roosevelt administration debated imposing an embargo on oil, the key U.S. export to Japan. Though some in the administration wanted to do everything possible to prevent Japanese expansion, Secretary of State Hull feared that cutting off trade would encourage Japan to meet its needs for natural resources through conquest of the Dutch East Indies, British Malaya, British Burma, or the Philippines.

With Roosevelt's attention focused on Europe, Hull took the lead in setting Asian policy and negotiating with Japan. Beginning in March 1941, he and Japanese ambassador Kichisaburō Nomura sought to reach an accommodation between their governments. As the U.S. did not accept the Japanese occupation of China, and Japan would not end it, the two positions were irreconcilable. After Germany launched its invasion of the Soviet Union in June 1941, the Japanese decided not to avoid war in Siberia—its first priority had to be oil. In July, Japan took control of southern French Indochina, a potential staging ground for an attack on British Malaya and the Dutch East Indies, with their rich oil fields. In response, the U.S. cut off the sale of oil to Japan, which thus lost more than 95% of its supply.

Following the American embargo, Japanese leaders turned their attention to the conquest of the Dutch East Indies, which had a large oil supply. To consolidate control of the Dutch East Indies, Imperial Japanese Armed Forces planners believed they needed to capture the Philippines, take control of the British base at Singapore, and defeat the United States Pacific Fleet, stationed at Naval Station Pearl Harbor, Hawaii. No Japanese leader saw total defeat of the United States as feasible, but many hoped that a decisive naval victory would convince the Americans to leave control of the Pacific to Japan. Prime Minister Konoye sought a summit with Roosevelt to avoid war, but continued U.S. insistence on Japanese withdrawal from China scuttled those plans. Tojo succeeded Konoye as prime minister in October, and the Japanese began preparations for an attack on the United States. In November, Nomura made a final offer, asking for reopened trade and acceptance of the Japanese campaign in China in return for Japan's pledge not to attack Southeast Asia. In large part because the U.S. feared that Japan would attack the Soviet Union after conquering China, Roosevelt declined the offer, and negotiations collapsed on November 26.

=== Pearl Harbor, December 7, 1941 ===
On the morning of December 7, 1941, the Japanese struck the U.S. naval base at Pearl Harbor with a surprise attack, knocking out the main United States Pacific Fleet battleship fleet and killing 2,403 American servicemen and civilians. The great majority of scholars have rejected a variety of conspiracy theories that Washington knew in advance. The Japanese guarded their secrets closely, and while senior American officials were aware that war was imminent, they did not expect an attack on Pearl Harbor. Roosevelt had anticipated that the first attack would take place in the Dutch East Indies, Thailand, or the Philippines.

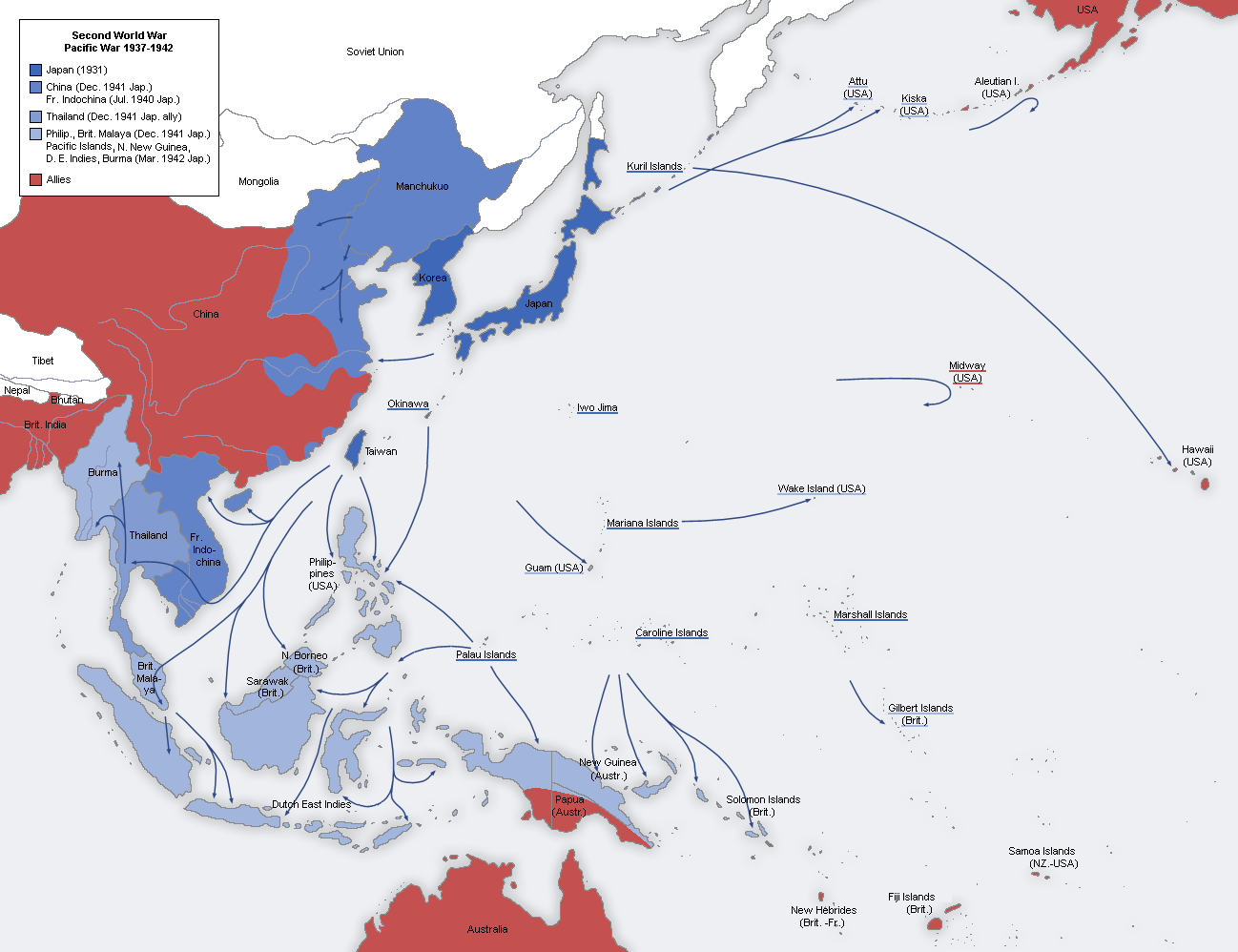
Map of Japanese military advances, until mid-1942

== World War II 1941–1945 ==
After Pearl Harbor, antiwar sentiment in the United States evaporated overnight. For the first time since the early 19th century, foreign policy became the American public's top priority. Roosevelt called for war in his "Infamy Speech" to Congress, in which he said: "Yesterday, December 7, 1941—a date which will live in infamy—the United States of America was suddenly and deliberately attacked by naval and air forces of the Empire of Japan." On December 8, Congress voted almost unanimously to declare war against Japan. On December 11, Germany and Italy declared war on the United States, which responded in kind.

Roosevelt portrayed the war as a crusade against aggressive dictatorships that threatened peace and democracy throughout the world. He and his military advisers implemented a war strategy with the objectives of halting the German advances in the Soviet Union and in North Africa; launching an invasion of western Europe to crush Nazi Germany between two fronts; saving China; and defeating Japan. But public opinion gave priority to the destruction of Japan, so American forces were sent chiefly to the Pacific in 1942. Japan launched an aerial attack on U.S. forces in the Philippines just hours after the attack on Pearl Harbor. By the end of the month, the Japanese had launched an invasion of the Philippines. General Douglas MacArthur led U.S. resistance in the Philippines until March 1942, when Roosevelt ordered him to evacuate to Australia. American forces on the Philippines surrendered in May 1942, leaving Japan with approximately 10,000 American prisoners. While it was subduing the Philippines, Japan also conquered Thailand, British Malaya, Singapore, much of Burma, and the Dutch East Indies.

In his role as the leader of the United States before and during World War II, Roosevelt tried to avoid repeating what he saw as Woodrow Wilson's mistakes in World War I. He often made exactly the opposite decisions. Wilson called for neutrality in thought and deed, while Roosevelt made clear that his administration strongly favored Britain and China. Unlike the loans in World War I, the United States made large-scale grants of military and economic aid to the Allies through Lend-Lease, with little expectation of repayment. Wilson did not greatly expand war production before the declaration of war; Roosevelt did. Wilson waited for the declaration to begin a draft; Roosevelt started one in 1940. Wilson never made the United States an official ally; Roosevelt did. Wilson never met with top Allied leaders; Roosevelt did. Wilson proclaimed independent policy, as seen in the 14 Points, while Roosevelt sought a collaborative policy with the Allies. In 1917, the United States declared war on Germany; in 1941, Roosevelt waited until the enemy attacked at Pearl Harbor. Wilson refused to collaborate with the Republican Party; Roosevelt named leading Republicans to head the War Department and the Navy Department. Wilson let General John J. Pershing make major military decisions; Roosevelt made the major decisions in his war, including the "Europe first" strategy. He rejected the idea of an armistice, demanding unconditional surrender. Roosevelt often mentioned his role as Assistant Secretary of the Navy in the Wilson administration, but added that he had learned more from Wilson's errors than from his successes. Robert E. Sherwood argues:

Roosevelt could never forget Wilson's mistakes....there was no motivating force in all of Roosevelt's wartime political policy stronger than the determination to prevent repetition of the same mistakes.

=== Alliances, economic warfare, and other wartime issues ===
==== Four Policemen ====
In late December 1941 Churchill and Roosevelt met at the Arcadia Conference, which established a joint strategy between the U.S. and Britain. Both agreed on a Europe first strategy that would prioritize the defeat of Germany before Japan. With British forces focused on the war in Europe, and with the Soviet Union not at war with Japan, the United States would take the lead in the Pacific War despite its own focus on Germany. The U.S. and Britain established the Combined Chiefs of Staff to coordinate military policy and the Combined Munitions Assignments Board to coordinate the allocation of supplies. An agreement was also reached to establish a centralized command in the Pacific theater called ABDA, named for the American, British, Dutch, and Australian forces in the theater. On January 1, 1942, the United States, Britain, China, the Soviet Union, and twenty-two other countries issued the Declaration by United Nations, in which each nation pledged to defeat the Axis powers. These countries opposed to the Axis would be known as the Allied Powers.

Roosevelt coined the term "Four Policemen" to refer the "Big Four" Allied powers of World War II, the United States, the United Kingdom, the Soviet Union and China. Roosevelt, Churchill, Soviet leader Joseph Stalin, and Chinese Generalissimo Chiang Kai-shek cooperated informally on a plan in which American and British troops concentrated in the West; Soviet troops fought on the Eastern front; and Chinese, British and American troops fought in Asia and the Pacific. The Allies formulated strategy in a series of high-profile conferences as well as contact through diplomatic and military channels. Roosevelt had a close relationship with Churchill, but he and his advisers quickly lost respect for Chiang's government, viewing it as hopelessly corrupt. General Joseph Stilwell, who was assigned to lead U.S. forces in the China Burma India Theater, came to believe that Chiang was more concerned with defeating Mao's Communists than with defeating the Japanese. U.S. and Soviet leaders distrusted each other throughout the war, and relations further suffered after 1943 as both sides supported sympathetic governments in liberated territories.

==== Roosevelt opposes European colonies in Asia ====
Roosevelt was strongly committed to terminating European colonialism in Asia. He tried to pressure Churchill regarding independence of India, but Churchill fought back vociferously, forcing Roosevelt to drop that kind of attack. Roosevelt then turned to French Indochina. He wanted to put it under an international trusteeship. He wanted the United States to work closely with China to become the policeman for the region and stabilize it; the U.S. would provide suitable financing. The scheme was directly contrary to the Free French, for Charles de Gaulle had a grand vision of the French overseas empire as the base for his return to defeat Vichy France. Roosevelt could not abide de Gaulle, but Winston Churchill realized that Britain needed French help to reestablish its position in Europe after the war. He and the British foreign office decided to work closely with de Gaulle to achieve that goal, and therefore they had to frustrate Roosevelt's decolonization scheme. In doing so, they had considerable support from like-minded American officials. The basic weakness of Roosevelt's scheme was its dependence on Chiang Kai-shek the ruler of China. Chiang's regime virtually collapsed under Japanese pressure in 1944, and Japan overran the American airbases that were built to attack Japan. The Pentagon's plans to use China as a base to destroy Japan collapsed, so the United States Army Air Forces turned its attention to attacking Japan with very long-range B-29 bombers based in the Pacific. The American military no longer needed China or Southeast Asia. China clearly was too weak to be a policeman. With the defeat of Japan, Britain took over Southeast Asia and returned Indochina to France. Roosevelt realized his trusteeship plan was dead, and accepted the British-French actions as necessary to stabilize Southeast Asia.

==== Other allies ====
By the end of the war, several states, including all of Latin America, had joined the Allies. Roosevelt's appointment of young Nelson Rockefeller to head the new, well-funded Office of the Coordinator of Inter-American Affairs provided energetic leadership. Under Rockefeller's leadership, the U.S. spent millions on radio broadcasts, motion pictures, and other anti-fascist propaganda. American advertising techniques generated a push back in Mexico, especially, where well-informed locals resisted heavy-handed American influence. Nevertheless, Mexico was a valuable ally in the war. A deal was reached whereby 250,000 Mexican citizens living in the United States served in the American forces; over 1000 were killed in combat. In addition to propaganda, large sums were allocated for economic support and development. On the whole the Roosevelt policy in Latin America was a political success, except in Argentina, which tolerated German influence, and refused to follow Washington's lead until the war was practically over. Outside of Latin America, the U.S. paid particularly close attention to its oil-rich allies in the Middle East, marking the start of sustained American engagement in the region.

==== Lend-Lease and economic warfare ====
The main American role in the war, beyond the military mission itself, was financing the war and providing large quantities of munitions and civilian goods. Lend lease, as passed by Congress in 1941, was a declaration of economic warfare, and that economic warfare continued after the attack on Pearl Harbor. Roosevelt believed that the financing of World War I through loans to the Allies, with the demand for repayment after the war, had been a mistake. He set up the Lend Lease system as a war program, financed through the military budget. As soon as the war with Japan ended it was terminated. The president chose the leadership—Harry Hopkins and Edward Stettinius Jr. played major roles—and exercised close oversight and control. One problem that bedeviled the program in 1942 was the strictly limited supply of munitions that had to be divided between Lend Lease and American forces. Roosevelt insisted to the military that the Soviet Union was to get all the supplies he had promised it. Lend-lease aid to the Soviet Union declined somewhat in mid-1942 after the United States began to prepare for military operations in North Africa.

The U.S. spent about $40 billion on Lend Lease aid to the British Empire, the Soviet Union, France, China, and some smaller countries. That amounted to about 11% of the cost of the war to the U.S. It received back about $7.8 billion in goods and services provided by the recipients to the United States, especially the cost of food and rent for American installations abroad. Britain received $30 billion, Russia received $10.7 billion, and all other countries $2.9 billion. When the question of repayment arose, Roosevelt insisted the United States did not want a postwar debt problem of the sort that had troubled relations after the first world war. The recipients provided bases and supplies to American forces on their own soil; this was referred informally as "Reverse Lend Lease," and the combined total of this aid came to approximately $7.8 billion overall. In the end, none of the Allied Powers paid for the goods received during the war, although they did pay for goods in transit that were received after the program ended. Roosevelt told Congress in June 1942:

The real costs of the war cannot be measured, nor compared, nor paid for in money. They must and are being met in blood and toil... If each country devotes roughly the same fraction of its national production to the war, then the financial burden of war is distributed equally among the United Nations in accordance with their ability to pay.

A major issue in the economic war was the transportation of supplies. After Germany declared war on the United States, Hitler removed all restrictions on the German submarine fleet. German submarines ravaged Allied shipping in the Atlantic, with many of the attacks taking place within ten miles of the East Coast of the United States in early 1942. The U.S. Navy faced difficulties in simultaneously protecting Atlantic shipping while also prosecuting the war against Japan, and over one millions tons of Allied shipping was lost in 1942. The cracking of the German Enigma code, along with the construction and deployment of American naval escorts and maritime patrol aircraft helped give the Allied Powers the upper hand in the Battle of the Atlantic after 1942. After the Allies sank dozens of U-boats early 1943, most German submarines were withdrawn from the North Atlantic.

The United States began a strategic bombing campaign against Axis forces in Europe in mid-1942. Attacks initially targeted locations in France, Belgium, and the Netherlands; U.S. bombers launched their first attack against a target in Germany in January 1943. In an attempt to destroy Germany's industrial capacity, Allied bombers struck targets such as oil refineries and ball-bearing factories. After taking heavy losses in Operation Tidal Wave and the Second Raid on Schweinfurt, the U.S. significantly scaled back the strategic bombing of Germany. General Carl Andrew Spaatz re-directed U.S. strategic bombing efforts to focus on the German aircraft production facilities, and the Allies enjoyed air superiority in Europe after February 1944. Allied strategic bombing escalated in late 1944, with an emphasis placed on Germany's transportation infrastructure and oil resources. With the goal of forcing a quick German surrender, in 1945 the Allies launched attacks on Berlin and Dresden that killed tens of thousands of civilians.

==== Reaction to the Holocaust ====
Public opinion in the 1930s was very hostile to new immigration to the United States. Compounded by anti-Semitism, and the reluctance of Jewish newspapers and film producers to become involved, very little was done to rescue European Jews threatened by the Nazis. After Kristallnacht in 1938, Roosevelt helped expedite Jewish immigration from Germany and allowed Austrian and German citizens already in the United States to stay indefinitely. He was prevented from accepting more Jewish immigrants by the prevalence of nativism and antisemitism among voters and members of Congress, resistance in the American Jewish community to the acceptance of Eastern European Jewish immigrants, and the restrictive Immigration Act of 1924. The Immigration Act of 1924 allowed only 150,000 immigrants to the United States per year and set firm quotas for each country, and in midst of the Great Depression there was little popular support for revisions to the law that would allow for a more liberal immigration policy. In 1938 Roosevelt pushed the limits of his executive authority to allow 50,000 German Jews, to escape from Europe or remain in the United States past their visa expiration. Roosevelt's State Department, however, was very hostile to the numerous proposals made it to rescue more Jews by bringing them to the United States.

Germany in January 1942 implemented the "Final Solution"–the extermination of all Jews. American officials learned of the scale of the Nazi extermination campaign in the following months. Against the objections of his State Department, Roosevelt convinced the other Allied leaders to jointly issue the Joint Declaration by Members of the United Nations, which condemned the ongoing Holocaust and promised to try its perpetrators as war criminals. In January 1944, Roosevelt established the War Refugee Board to aid Jews and other victims of Axis atrocities. Aside from these actions, Roosevelt believed that the best way to help the persecuted populations of Europe was to win the war as quickly as possible. Top military leaders and War Department leaders rejected any campaign to bomb the extermination camps or the rail lines leading to the camps, fearing it would be a diversion from the war effort. According to biographer Jean Edward Smith, there is no evidence that anyone ever proposed such a campaign to Roosevelt himself. In sum, Roosevelt took significant but limited action regarding the persecution in Germany, the refugee crisis in the 1930s, and the systematic killing of six million Jews in gas chambers after 1941. Public and elite opinion, including the Jewish-American leadership, generated little pressure to take action. Roosevelt's legacy remains highly controversial among historians and the general public. Richard Breitman and Allan J. Lichtman state:, "This ongoing quarrel is unforgiving, passionate, and politically charged." They conclude that Roosevelt:

did more for the Jews than any other world figure, even if his efforts seem deficient in retrospect. He was a far better president for Jews than any of his political adversaries would have been. Roosevelt defied most Republican opponents and some isolationist Democrats to lead political and military opposition to Nazi Germany's plan for expansion and world domination.

== Course of the war ==
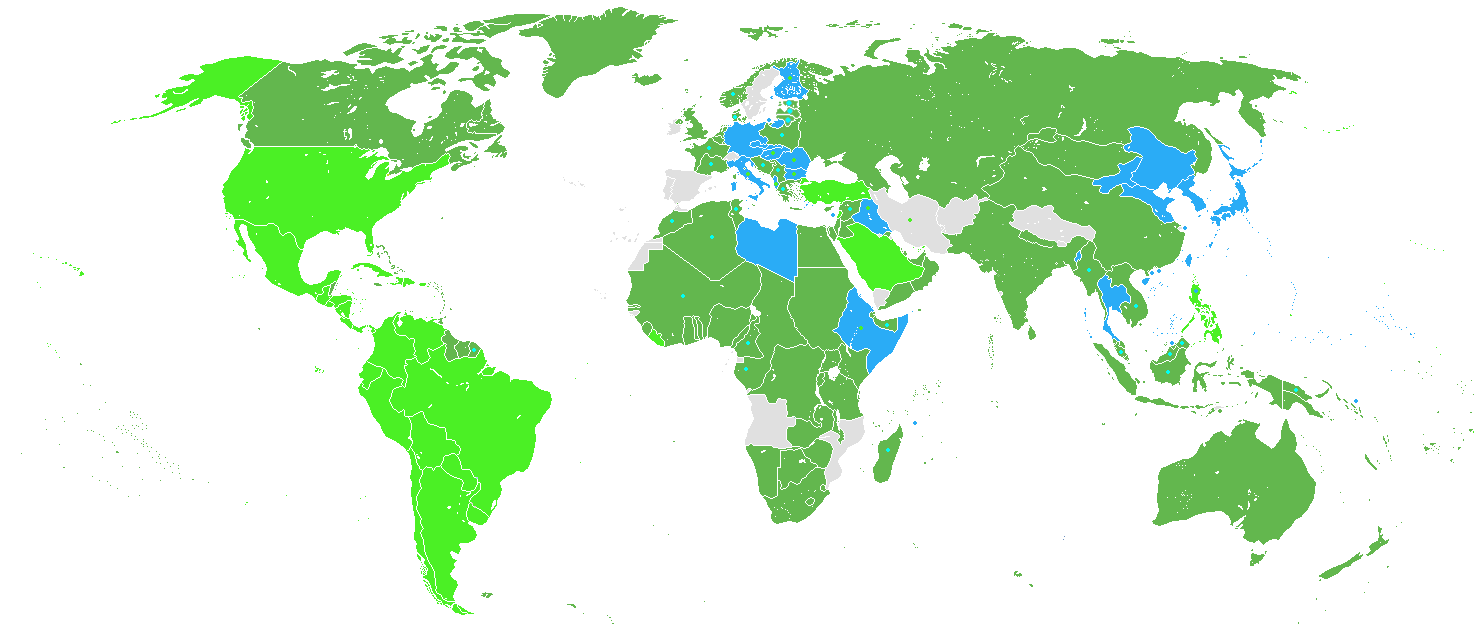
The two alliances of World War II, with the Axis Powers in blue and the Allied Powers in green

=== Mediterranean and European theater ===
The Soviets urged an Anglo-American invasion of France in order to divert German troops and munitions from the Eastern front. Churchill in particular was reluctant to commit troops in Europe in 1942, and strongly favored launching a campaign designed to expel the Axis Powers from North Africa and to consolidate Allied power in the Mediterranean. General George Marshall and Admiral Ernest King opposed the decision to prioritize North Africa, which they saw as relatively unimportant to the overall war. Roosevelt overrode their objections, as he wanted the U.S. to commit ground forces in the European theater, in 1942, and with British cooperation.

The Allies invaded French North Africa in November 1942, securing the quick surrender of local Vichy French forces. That surrender was arranged through a deal between General Dwight D. Eisenhower, the supreme commander of the Allied invasion of North Africa, and Vichy Admiral François Darlan. The cooperation with Darlan allowed the Allies to quickly gain control of much of North Africa, but it also alienated Free French leader Charles de Gaulle and other opponents of the Vichy regime. Darlan was assassinated in December 1942, while Vichy France broke relations with the United States and requested that German forces prevent the Allies from gaining control of French Tunisia. The experience with de Gaulle, Darlan, and another French leader, Henri Giraud, convinced Roosevelt of the necessity to avoid becoming closely associated with any French faction for the remainder of the war. In the Tunisian Campaign, Eisenhower initially faced great difficulties in leading his inexperienced force to success, but Allied forces eventually gained the upper hand. 250,000 Axis soldiers surrendered in May 1943, bringing an end to the North African Campaign.

At the January 1943 Casablanca Conference, the U.S. and Britain agreed to defeat Axis forces in North Africa and then launch an invasion of Sicily after the North African campaign, with an attack on France to follow in 1944. At the conference, Roosevelt also announced that he would only accept the unconditional surrender of Germany, Japan, and Italy. The demand for unconditional surrender was calculated to reassure the Soviets, who were still insisting on an immediate attack on German-occupied France, that the United States would not seek a negotiated peace with Germany. In February 1943, the Soviet Union turned the tide on the Eastern Front by winning a decisive victory at the Battle of Stalingrad. The Allies launched an invasion of Sicily in July 1943, capturing the island by the end of the following month. During the campaign in Sicily, King Victor Emmanuel III of Italy arrested Benito Mussolini and replaced him with Pietro Badoglio, who secretly negotiated a surrender with the Allies. Despite his earlier insistence on unconditional surrender, Roosevelt accepted armistice terms that allowed Badoglio to remain in power. Germany quickly restored Mussolini to power and set up a puppet state in northern Italy. The Allied invasion of mainland Italy commenced in September 1943, but the Italian Campaign moved slowly until 1945. Roosevelt consented to the campaign only on the condition that the British commit to an invasion of France in mid-1944, and the Allied Powers began to build up a force for that operation, diverting soldiers from the Italian Campaign.

To command the invasion of France, Roosevelt passed over Marshall and in favor of General Dwight D. Eisenhower. Roosevelt had originally wanted to appoint Marshall to the command, but top military leaders argued that Marshall was indispensable in his role in Washington. While building up forces in Britain, the Allied Powers engaged in Operation Bodyguard, an elaborate campaign designed to mask where the Allies would land in Northwestern Europe. Eisenhower launched Operation Overlord, a landing in the Northern French region of Normandy, on June 6, 1944. Supported by 12,000 aircraft that provided complete control of the air, and the largest naval force ever assembled, the Allies successfully established a beachhead in Normandy and then advanced further into France. Though reluctant to back an unelected government, Roosevelt recognized Charles de Gaulle's Provisional Government of the French Republic as the de facto government of France in July 1944.

After the Battle of the Falaise Pocket, the Allies pushed Axis forces back towards Germany, capturing Paris in August 1944. That same month, the Allies launched Operation Dragoon, an invasion of Southern France. Facing logistical issues, Allied forces attempted to secure the Belgian port of Antwerp before moving on Germany's Ruhr region, but the failure of Operation Market Garden delayed the Western Allied invasion of Germany. In late 1944, Hitler began to amass forces for a major offensive designed to convince the United States and Britain to seek a negotiated peace. A surprise German attack in December 1944 marked the start of the Battle of the Bulge, but the Allies were able to beat back the attack in the following weeks. The Allies advanced across the Rhine River in March 1945, and took control of the Ruhr and the Saarland, another key industrial region. By April 1945, Nazi resistance was crumbling in the face of advances by both the Western Allies and the Soviet Union.

=== Pacific theater ===
After sweeping across Maritime Southeast Asia in the months following Pearl Harbor, Japan looked to further expand its territory, taking control of the Solomon Islands and parts of New Guinea. In May 1942, the United States Navy and Royal Australian Navy defeated the Imperial Japanese Navy in the Battle of the Coral Sea, prompting an Imperial Japanese Army land campaign across the island of New Guinea. Seeking to seize control of a strategically placed island and destroy the U.S. fleet in the Pacific, Japan also launched an attack on the American-held Midway Atoll. With the assistance of the Magic cryptanalysis project, Admiral Chester Nimitz led an American force that defeated the Japanese navy at the Battle of Midway. The Battle of Midway resulted in the Japanese fleet's loss of four crucial aircraft carriers, and the battle marked a major reversal of fortune in the Pacific War. In August 1942, the United States launched an invasion of the Japanese-held South Pacific island of Guadalcanal in the Solomon Islands; Japanese and American forces contested control of Guadalcanal until February 1943. After the Battle of Guadalcanal, the U.S. adopted an island hopping strategy in order to avoid entrenched Japanese garrisons. By early 1944, Allied forces had established control over much of New Guinea and had landed on the adjacent island of New Britain.

While the campaign in the Southwest Pacific continued, U.S. forces launched an offensive in the Central Pacific, beginning with the November 1943 Battle of Tarawa. The U.S. next captured Japanese positions in the Marshall Islands and the Caroline Islands. In June 1944, the U.S. launched an attack on Saipan, in the Mariana Islands, gaining control of the island in early July at the cost of fourteen thousand casualties. As the Battle of Saipan continued, the U.S. won a major naval victory in the Battle of the Philippine Sea, sinking three Japanese aircraft carriers. In July 1944, Roosevelt met with Nimitz and MacArthur, where he authorized the continuation of the campaigns in the Southwest Pacific and the Central Pacific. MacArthur's force would continue its advance towards the Philippines, while the Central Pacific campaign would work its way towards Japan. The U.S. landed on the Philippine island of Leyte in October 1944, provoking a Japanese naval response, as the Philippine Islands maintained a critical position on the Japanese oil supply route from the Dutch East Indies. The Japanese navy was decimated in the resulting Battle of Leyte Gulf, which is sometimes claimed to be the "largest naval battle in history." MacArthur's forces secured control of Leyte in December and had largely re-taken control of the Philippines by March 1945.

The U.S. began launching strategic bombing raids on Japan from the Mariana Islands in November 1944, but Japan still controlled several islands that provided defense for the Japanese archipelago. In February 1945, the U.S. launched an invasion of the well-defended island of Iwo Jima, taking control of that island the following month. On April 1, the U.S. landed on Okinawa Island, the largest of the Ryukyu Islands. The Japanese allowed the Americans to land on the island before launching a fierce attack that included kamikaze suicide attacks by Japanese aircraft. Japanese forces on Okinawa held out until June 1945; U.S. forces suffered over 60,000 casualties during the operation.

== Post-war planning ==
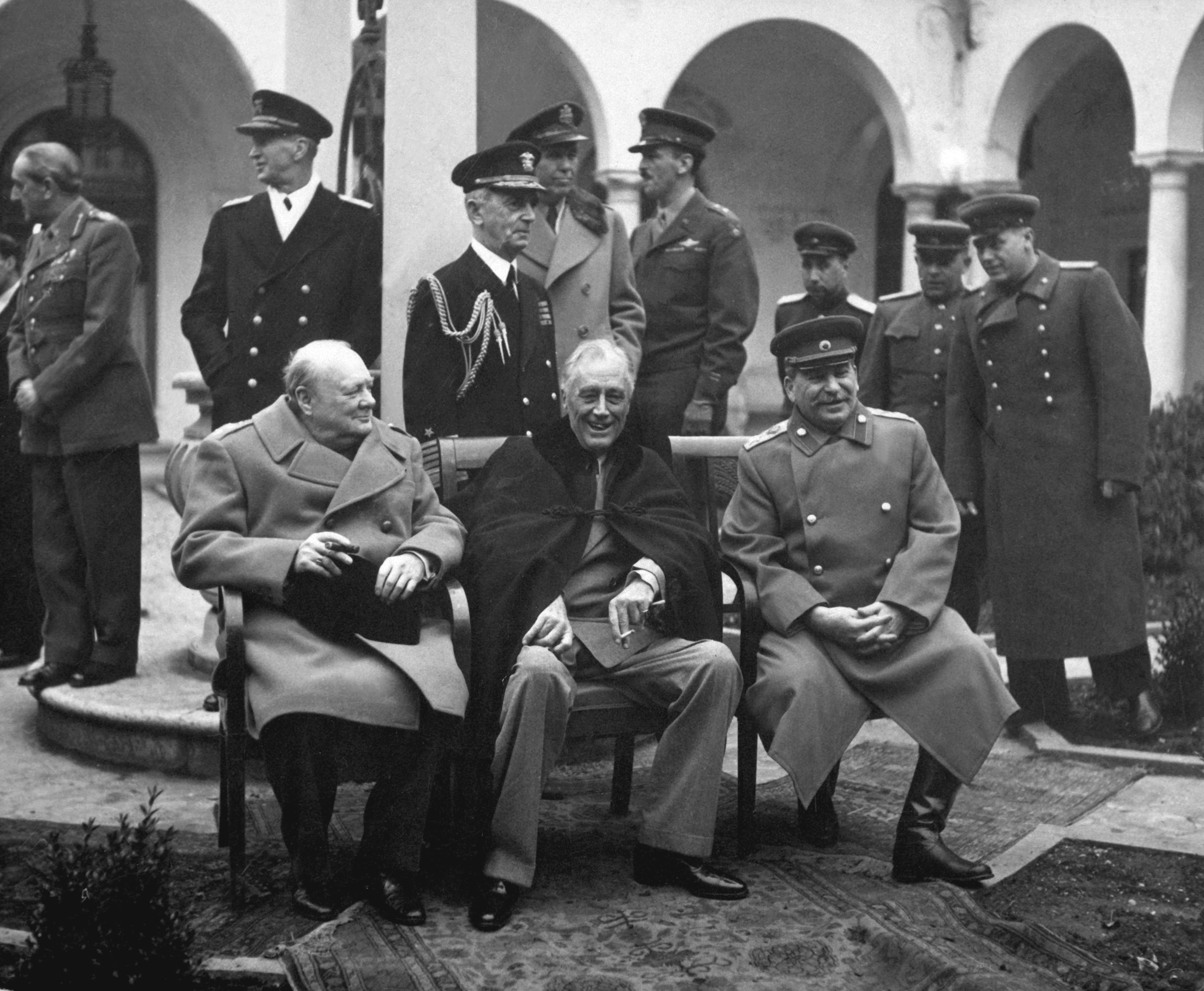
Churchill, FDR, and Stalin at Yalta, two months before Roosevelt's death

In late 1943, Roosevelt, Churchill, and Stalin agreed to meet to discuss strategy and post-war plans at the Tehran Conference, which marked Roosevelt's first face-to-face meeting with Stalin. At the conference, Britain and the United States committed to opening a second front against Germany in 1944, while Stalin committed to entering the war against Japan at an unspecified date. Roosevelt also privately indicated acceptance of Soviet control of the Baltic states and Soviet plans to shift Poland's borders to the west. Stalin, meanwhile, committed to joining the war against Japan after the defeat of Germany.

Post-war plans increasingly came to the fore as the Allies scored major victories in 1944. Taking up the Wilsonian mantle, Roosevelt made his highest priority the establishment of the United Nations. It would be a permanent intergovernmental organization that would succeed the League of Nations. Roosevelt expected it would be controlled by Washington, Moscow, London and Beijing, and would resolve all major world problems. The wartime economic boom and the experience of the Great Depression convinced many Americans of the need to lower trade barriers. Lend-Lease agreements included provisions for eliminating tariffs, and the U.S. especially desired the dismantlement of the British Imperial Preference system of tariffs. At the Bretton Woods Conference, the Allies agreed to the creation of the International Monetary Fund, which would provide for currency stabilization, and the World Bank, which would fund post-war rebuilding.

Roosevelt, Churchill, and Stalin met for a second time at the February 1945 Yalta Conference. With the end of the war in Europe approaching, Roosevelt's primary focus was on convincing Stalin to enter the war against Japan, because casualty estimates, depending on their assumptions, ranged from hundreds of thousands to millions for an Allied invasion of Japan. In return for its entrance into the war against Japan, the Soviet Union was promised control of Asian territories such as Sakhalin Island. With the Soviet Union in control of much of Eastern Europe by early 1945, Roosevelt had little leverage over Soviet actions in Central and Eastern Europe. He did not push for the immediate evacuation of Soviet Red Army soldiers from Poland, but he did win the issuance of the Declaration on Liberated Europe, which promised free elections in countries that had been occupied by Germany. Against Soviet pressure, Roosevelt and Churchill refused to consent to imposing huge reparations and deindustrialization on Germany after the war. Roosevelt's role in the Yalta Conference has been controversial; critics charge that he naively trusted the Soviet Union to allow free elections in Eastern Europe, while supporters argue that there was little more that Roosevelt could have done for the Eastern European countries given the Soviet occupation and the need for cooperation with the Soviet Union during and after the war.

=== Founding the United Nations ===
Roosevelt had been a strong supporter of the League of Nations back in 1919–20, but was determined to avoid the mistakes Wilson had made. The United Nations was FDR's highest postwar priority. He insisted on full coordination with the Republican leadership. He made sure that leading Republicans were on board, especially Senators Arthur Vandenberg of Michigan, and Warren Austin of Vermont. In a broad sense, Roosevelt believed that the UN could solve the minor problems and provide the chief mechanism to resolve any major Issues that arose among the great powers, all of whom had a veto. For FDR creating the UN was the most important goal for the entire war effort. Roosevelt was especially interested in international protection of human right, and in this area his wife played a major role as well.

The Allies had agreed to the basic structure of the new body at the Dumbarton Oaks Conference in 1944. At Yalta, Roosevelt, Churchill, and Stalin agreed to the establishment of the United Nations, as well as the structure of the United Nations Security Council. Stalin insisted on having a veto and FDR finally agreed. The participants at Yalta also agreed that the United Nations would convene for the first time in San Francisco in April 1945 in the United Nations Conference on International Organization. Roosevelt considered the United Nations to be his most important legacy. He provided continuous backstage political support at home and with Churchill and Stalin abroad. The Big Four of the United States, Britain, Soviet Union and China would make the major decisions, with France added later to provide permanent members of the all-powerful Security Council. Each had a veto power, thus avoiding the fatal weakness of the League of Nations, which had theoretically been able to order its members to act in defiance of their own parliaments.

=== Anti-imperialism ===
British, French, and Dutch leaders all hoped to retain or reclaim their colonial possessions after the war. The U.S. was committed to granting independence to the Commonwealth of the Philippines following the end of the war, and Roosevelt frequently pressured Churchill to similarly commit to the independence of India, Burma, Malaya, and Hong Kong. His motives included principled opposition to colonialism, practical concern for the outcome of the war, and the need to build support for the U.S. in a future independent India. Churchill was deeply committed to imperialism and pushed back hard. Because the U.S. needed British cooperation in India to support China, Roosevelt had to draw back on his anti-colonialism. That annoyed Indian nationalist leaders, though most of those leaders were in British prisons for the duration because they would not support the war against Japan. Roosevelt also believed that France had performed the poorest in governing its colonies and resisting the Axis. He advocated for the placement of French Indochina under an international trusteeship once the war ended. This was opposed by the British, who was afraid of losing its own colonies if the idea of trusteeship gathered further momentum. Roosevelt also promised to return Chinese territories seized by Japan since 1895, and ended the practice of American special rights in China.

== Roosevelt's health ==
According to reviewer Dennis Dunn, the book The Dying President: Franklin D. Roosevelt, 1944–1945 (1998):

argues persuasively that FDR was too ill (of cardiovascular disease) to be president and that his physical disability led to a series of misjudgments and mistakes in 1944-45, including a lack of study of the need for the use of the atomic bomb against Japan, a nonchalance regarding the evidence of the Holocaust crime, an inattention to China and Chinese Communism, a casual support of French involvement in Vietnam with all of the attendant consequences of that fatal mistake for American foreign policy in the postwar period, an inadvertent backing of the ridiculous Morgenthau Plan, and an unconscionable isolation of Truman.

== Timeline ==
- 1933 – Montevideo Convention. President Franklin D. Roosevelt declares the "Good Neighbor policy", US opposition to armed intervention in inter-American affairs.
- 1933 – London Economic Conference, to deal with Great Depression, collapses after US withdraws.
- 1933 – US extends diplomatic recognition of the Soviet Union.
- 1935 – Neutrality Act of 1935; when war breaks out prohibits all arms shipments (allowing shipment of oil, steel, chemicals); US citizens can travel on belligerent ships only at their own risk
- 1936 – Neutrality Act of 1936; no loans to belligerents
- 1936 – Spanish Civil War; US neutral; American Catholics support Nationalist forces; left-wing elements support Republican forces
- 1937 – Neutrality Act of 1937; 1935 laws apply to civil wars
- 1937 – Japan invades China, with full-scale war and many atrocities against Chinese; Japan conquers major cities and seacoast; Americans strongly sympathetic to China; Roosevelt does not invoke neutrality laws
- 1937 – Japanese planes sink the American gunboat, USS Panay along with three Standard Oil takers on the Yangtze River during the Battle of Nanking
- 1938 – Munich Pact sacrifices Czechoslovakia in the name of appeasement; US not involved but does not object
- 1939 – World War II begins in Europe, America initially neutral.
- 1940 – American intelligence breaks the Japanese diplomatic code with MAGIC.
- 1941 –

— July 29 Japan occupies the southern half of French Indochina, seen as a threatening move.
— July 30 US together with Britain and the Dutch government-in-exile imposes trade embargo against Japan, most crucially in oil.
— August 13 Atlantic Charter. Anglo-American summit off the coast of Newfoundland. Roosevelt and Winston Churchill agree (1) no territorial gains sought by America or Great Britain, (2) territorial adjustments must conform to people involved, (3) people have right to choose their own govt. (4) trade barriers lowered, (5) there must be disarmament, (6) there must be freedom from want and fear ("Four Freedoms" of FDR), (7) there must be freedom of the seas, (8) there must be an association of nations. Charter is accepted by Allies, who call themselves "the United Nations".
— October 31 American destroyer USS Reuben James sunk by a U-boat. Rise in German-American tensions.
— December 6 American intelligence fails to predict attack on Pearl Harbor.
— December 7 Attack on Pearl Harbor. United States is hit by surprise by Japanese Navy.
— December 11 Germany and Italy declare war on the U.S.

- 1942

— August 8 Riegner Telegram received in Washington. Gerhart M. Riegner of the World Jewish Congress has received reliable information that Germany is engaged in a campaign of extermination against the Jews of Europe.

- 1943 –

— January Casablanca Conference. Roosevelt and Churchill meet to plan European strategy. Unconditional surrender of Axis countries demanded, Soviet aid and participation, invasion of Sicily and Italy planned
— October 30 Moscow Declaration. Joint statement by the United States, United Kingdom and the Soviet Union promises that German leaders will be tried for war crimes after the Allied victory.
— November Cairo Conference. Roosevelt, Churchill and Chiang Kai-shek meet to make decisions about postwar Asia: Japan returns all territory, independent Korea.
— November Tehran Conference. Roosevelt and Churchill meet with Stalin.

- 1944 – Monetary and Financial Conference held in July in Bretton Woods, New Hampshire; International Monetary Fund and International Bank for Reconstruction and Development (World Bank) created to aid nations devastated by the war and to stabilize the international monetary system.
- 1944 – Dumbarton Oaks Conference held in August in Washington;
- 1945 – February 4–11 Yalta Conference with Joseph Stalin and Churchill; agreement on division of Eastern Europe
- 1945 – Surrender of Germany (V-E Day)
- 1945 – July 17 – August 2 Potsdam Conference; President Harry S. Truman meets with Stalin and British Prime Minister Clement Attlee; tells Stalin of atomic bomb; gives Japan last warning to surrender; Germany (and Austria) divided into 4 zones of occupation

== See also ==
- Appeasement
- Causes of World War II
- Diplomatic history of World War II
- Foreign policy of the United States
- Foreign policy of the Harry S. Truman administration
- History of the United Nations § Origins
- International relations (1919–1939), global perspective
- Timeline of United States diplomatic history
- United States non-interventionism#Isolationism between the World Wars, on isolationism
- United Kingdom–United States relations in World War II
- Allies at War by Tim Bouverie (2025)
