= Naval Act of 1916 =

- Other short titles: Big Navy Act; Naval Construction Act of 1916; Naval Expansion Act of 1916
- Long title: An Act making appropriations for the naval service for the fiscal year ending June thirtieth, nineteen hundred and seventeen, and for other purposes.
- Nicknames: Naval Service Appropriations Act of 1916
- Enacted by: the 64th United States Congress
- Effective: August 29, 1916

Citations
- Public law: 64-241
- Statutes at Large: 39 Stat. 556

Legislative history
- Introduced in the House as H.R. 15947 on May 29, 1916; Passed the House on June 2, 1916 (363-4); Passed the Senate on July 21, 1916 (71-8) with amendment; House agreed to Senate amendment on August 15, 1916 (282-51); Signed into law by President Woodrow Wilson on August 29, 1916

The Naval Act of 1916 was also called the "Big Navy Act" was United States federal legislation that called for vastly enlarging the US Navy. President Woodrow Wilson determined amidst the repeated incidents with Germany during the First World War to build "incomparably, the greatest Navy in the world" over a ten-year period with the intent of making the U.S. Navy able to defend itself against any European power. The bill called for the construction of ten 42,000-ton battleships, six battlecruisers, ten scout cruisers, fifty destroyers, and sixty-seven submarines. The plan was to start construction in 1919 and have the fleet completed by 1923.

The bill, signed in the middle of the First World War was not to prepare the United States for entry into that war, but rather to guarantee the security of the United States in what seemed an increasingly dangerous world. It was paralleled by the National Defense Act of 1916 that saw a similar expansion of the Army and National Guard.

== History ==
Opposition to heavily armored and thus expensive "Dreadnought" ships was strong in the House, but was overcome by the results of the one great naval battle of World War I between the British Royal Navy and the German High Seas Fleet, the Battle of Jutland (31 May–1 June 1916). The battle was evidence that a great tonnage Navy armed with large guns was necessary to defend U.S. shores and merchant ships on the seas in the event of war. President Wilson told Col. Edward House that he was anxious to hasten the day when the U.S. Navy was larger than the United Kingdom's, proclaiming "Let us build a Navy bigger than hers and do what we please."

The Senate passed the "Big Navy Act" on July 21 although it specified that five of ten battleships specified would be replaced with battlecruisers. Not until August 8 did Rep. Lemuel P. Padgett, Tennessee Democrat and Chairman of the House Naval Affairs Committee, confer with President Wilson and agree to support the Senate bill. Democrat Rep. Claude Kitchin of North Carolina despaired: "The United States today becomes the most militaristic naval nation on earth."

With the entry of the United States into the World War in 1917 the battleship program was paused in favor of the smaller ships that were more urgently needed to deal with the threat of German U-Boats.

At the end of war the Navy Department's General Board recommended in addition to the sixteen capital ships called for in the initial act, that an additional twelve battleships and sixteen battlecruisers be built. By 1922, the U.S. Navy, if all the ships had been built, could have surpassed the Royal Navy in size and strength. However the expectation of a ruinous arms race with the British and the Japanese led to the Washington Naval Conference of 1921–22 and the tonnage limit ratio agreements with the US having parity with the Royal Navy.

== See also ==
- Naval Act of 1938
- Naval Appropriations Act For 1922
- RMS Lusitania
- Two-Ocean Navy Act
