= Naval Appropriations Act For 1922 =

1922 United States legislation

Naval Appropriations Act for 1922
- Long title: An Act making appropriations for the naval service for the fiscal year ending June 30, 1922, and for other purposes.
- Nicknames: Naval Appropriations Act of 1921
- Enacted by: the 67th United States Congress
- Effective: July 12, 1921

Citations
- Public law: 67-35
- Statutes at Large: 42 Stat. 122

Legislative history
- Introduced in the House as H.R. 4803 by Patrick H. Kelley (R–MI) on April 22, 1921; Passed the House on April 28, 1921 (Passed); Passed the Senate on June 1, 1921 (54-17); Reported by the joint conference committee on June 7, 1921; agreed to by the House on June 28, 1921 (221-95) and by the Senate on July 6, 1921 (43-7); Signed into law by President Warren G. Harding on July 12, 1921

The Naval Appropriations Act For 1922 was passed by the 67th US Congress on July 12, 1921. The bill's purpose was to allocate funds for the US Navy. The money was for the fiscal year ending June 20, 1922.

== Details ==
The act did several things:

a) Congress declared that the income tax laws of the United States also constitute the income tax laws of the Virgin Islands, with the proceeds from the laws, when they function as Virgin Islands laws, to be paid into the treasury of the Virgin Islands rather than the treasury of the United States;
b) Post World War I demobilization relegated District Commandant duties to a subordinate and secondary status, as it was stipulated "that no part of this appropriation shall be available for the expense of any naval district unless the commandant thereof shall also be the commandant of a navy yard, naval training station, or naval operating base"; and
c) a new uniform Naval District staff manual was published, to be revised in 1927, but it ended up being the last of its kind. After World War II, each District devised its own staff manual.

== Amendment of 1921 Act ==
The Naval Appropriations Act of 1921 was amended by the 70th United States Congressional session prohibiting ordnance or ordnance material being applied for any other purposes other than the specified provision of the appropriations.

== See also ==
- Naval Act of 1916
- Naval Act of 1938
- Two-Ocean Navy Act
