= Dewey House =

Dewey House may refer to:

- Charles S. Dewey House, North Chicago, Illinois
- Joseph Dewey House, Westfield, Massachusetts
- Francis Dewey House Worcester, Massachusetts
- Dewey Cottage, South Kingstown, Rhode Island
- Dewey House (Hartford, Vermont)
