= Charles S. Dewey =

American politician and banker (1880-1980)

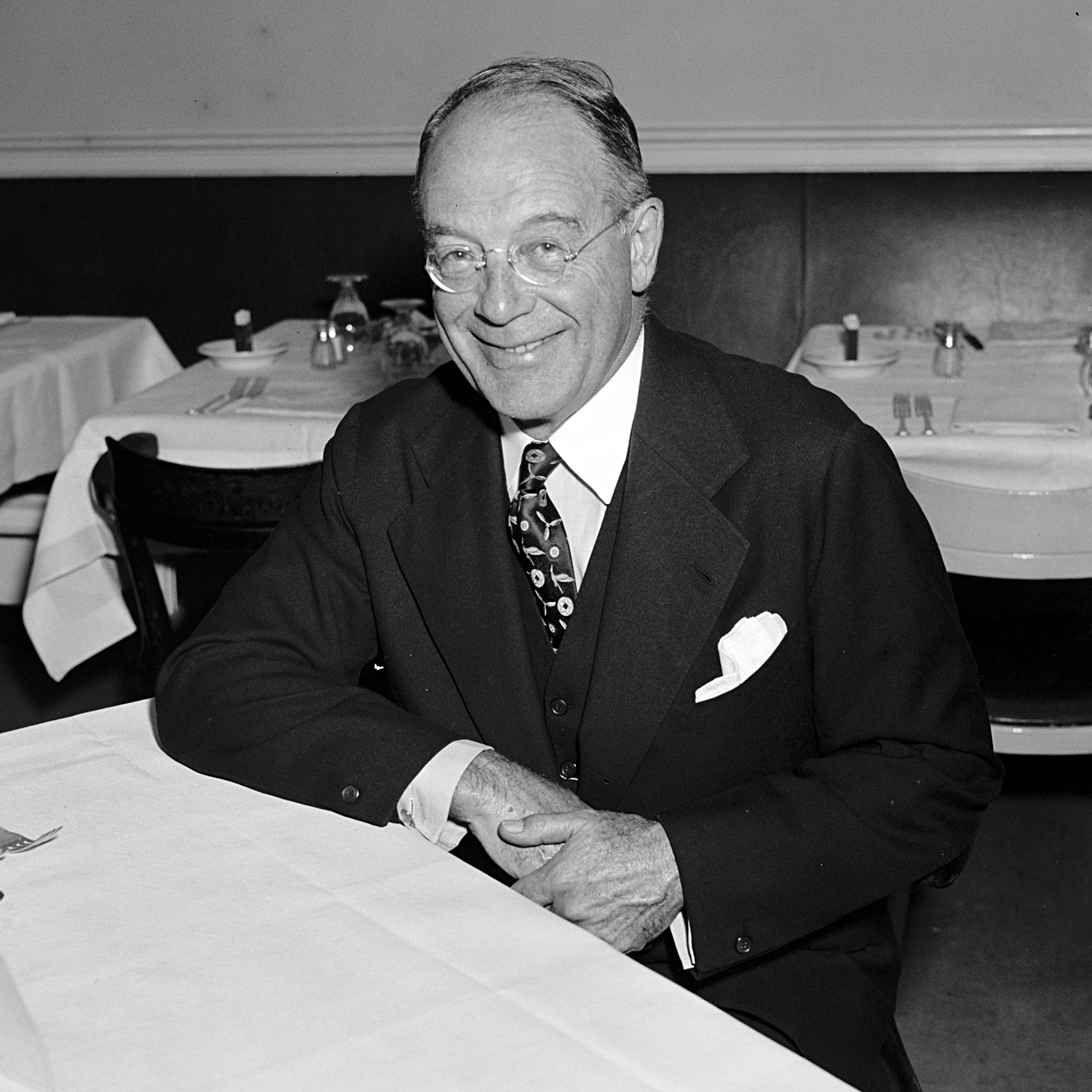
- Dewey in 1939

Member of the U.S. House of Representatives from Illinois' 9th district
- In office January 3, 1941 – January 3, 1945
- Preceded by: James McAndrews
- Succeeded by: Alexander J. Resa

Personal details
- Born: November 10, 1880 Cadiz, Ohio, US
- Died: December 27, 1980 (aged 100) Washington, D.C., US
- Party: Republican
- Profession: Banker and real estate developer

Charles Schuveldt Dewey (November 10, 1880 – December 27, 1980) was a banker and politician from Illinois. The cousin of George Dewey, Charles S. Dewey entered the real estate business in Chicago, Illinois, in 1905. He served in the United States Navy during World War I. In 1920, he began a career in banking as vice president of the Northern Trust Company of Chicago. Four years later, Andrew W. Mellon appointed Dewey an Assistant Secretary of the Treasury. A committee led by Dewey standardized the portraits and dimensions of American currency; the dimensions are still in use today.

Dewey resigned from the Treasury in 1927 to take a role as a financial adviser to the Polish government. Returning to Chicago in 1931 to join the Colgate-Palmolive Peet Company, Dewey remained in the city after the company moved to New York City. Overseeing the Milwaukee Avenue Bank, Dewey ran for election to the United States House of Representatives in 1938. Although defeated, Dewey managed to be elected in the two subsequent elections to Illinois's 9th congressional district. After another defeat in 1944, Dewey took a position as vice president with Chase National Bank. In 1948, Dewey served on a Marshall Plan committee. He retired from public life in the 1950s and oversaw the early stages of the Washington Hospital Center merger.

== Biography ==
Charles Schuveldt Dewey, a cousin of George Dewey, was born in Cadiz, Ohio, on November 10, 1880, to a prominent family. Dewey moved in infancy to Chicago, Illinois. He attended public schools, St. Paul's School, Concord, New Hampshire, and Yale University, where he contributed to campus humor magazine The Yale Record and was a member of St. Anthony Hall. After graduating from Yale in 1904, he engaged in the real estate business in Chicago, Illinois, from 1905 to 1917 served in the United States Navy from 1917 through 1919, being honorably discharged with the rank of senior lieutenant. He served as vice president of the Northern Trust Company of Chicago from 1920 to 1924.

Dewey served as Assistant Secretary of the Treasury for Fiscal Affairs from 1924 to 1927, serving under Andrew W. Mellon. There, he advocated for further use of silver to supplement the shortage of paper currency. Mellon appointed Dewey the chairman of the Committee on Currency Design to provide recommendations to the Bureau of Engraving and Printing. Dewey's committee standardized the portraits for each denomination. Furthermore, by reducing the size of paper currency to 2 11/16 by 6 5/6 inches (68 mm × 174 mm), the committee increased the number of bills printed on each pair of plates. This achievement alleviated the effects of the paper shortage on the Treasury, saving an estimated $13 million per year. After the Public Buildings Act of 1926 was approved, Dewey was appointed secretary of the Board of Architectural Consultants. This committee is best known for its design of Federal Triangle in Washington, D.C. Dewey convinced Mellon to hire Edward H. Bennett as a consultant to the project. Dewey simultaneously served as national treasurer of the American National Red Cross in 1926 and 1927.

Dewey resigned from the Treasury on November 16, 1927, to accept an appointment as financial adviser to the Polish Government and director of the Bank of Poland, a position he held for three years. The position was part of the Dawes Plan and created to stabilize the country following Józef Piłsudski's May Coup. He returned to Chicago in 1931 to join Colgate-Palmolive Peet Company as vice president and chairman of the Finance Committee. When the company moved its operations to New York City, New York, Dewey stayed in Chicago and took a position as head of the Milwaukee Avenue Bank.

He was an unsuccessful candidate for election in 1938 to the Seventy-sixth Congress but was elected as a Republican to the Seventy-seventh and Seventy-eighth Congresses (January 3, 1941 – January 3, 1945) for Illinois's 9th congressional district. He was an unsuccessful candidate for reelection in 1944 to the Seventy-ninth Congress and resumed the banking business as a vice president of Chase National Bank. He also served a two-year term as assistant president of the International Chamber of Commerce.

In April 1948 he was appointed agent general of the Joint Committee on Foreign Economic Cooperation, a review board for the Marshall Plan, and served until June 1952. He retired from public life and took a position as president of the Garfield Memorial Hospital in Washington, D.C. Dewey oversaw the early stages of the merging of the hospital into the Washington Hospital Center. Dewey retired from this role in 1953. He served as chairman of the District of Columbia Chapter of the American Red Cross from 1957 to 1961. He resided in Washington, D.C., until his death December 27, 1980, at age 100. He was interred in Arlington National Cemetery. He was the oldest living member of the House of Representatives at the time of his death.

He married Suzette de Marigny Hall, a descendant of Louisiana's Bernard de Marigny, in Chicago on December 20, 1905. His son, A. Peter Dewey, was accidentally shot and killed by Viet Minh in 1945, making him (arguably) the first person killed in the Vietnam War. Another son, Charles, Jr., who died at age 65 in 1974, also served in World War II, with the Office of Strategic Services in China, and was awarded the Medal of Freedom. Dewey's house in North Chicago, Illinois, seized by the government in 1918, was listed on the National Register of Historic Places in 1985. In 1959 he married the former Elizabeth Zolnay Smith. He was a stepfather to Lucinda Luce Smith and Melissa Tyler Smith, and a grandfather to Charles E, Lucinda K, and John Tyler Treat. His grandson David Alger was killed in the 9/11 attacks.

U.S. House of Representatives
Preceded by James McAndrews	Member of the U.S. House of Representatives from Illinois's 9th congressional district January 3, 1941 – January 3, 1945	Succeeded by Alexander J. Resa
Honorary titles
Preceded by Miles C. Allgood	Oldest living U.S. representative (Sitting or former); March 4, 1977 – December 27, 1980	Succeeded by Carl Vinson
