= Charles S. Dewey House =

Historic house in Illinois, United States

- Dewey House
- U.S. National Register of Historic Places
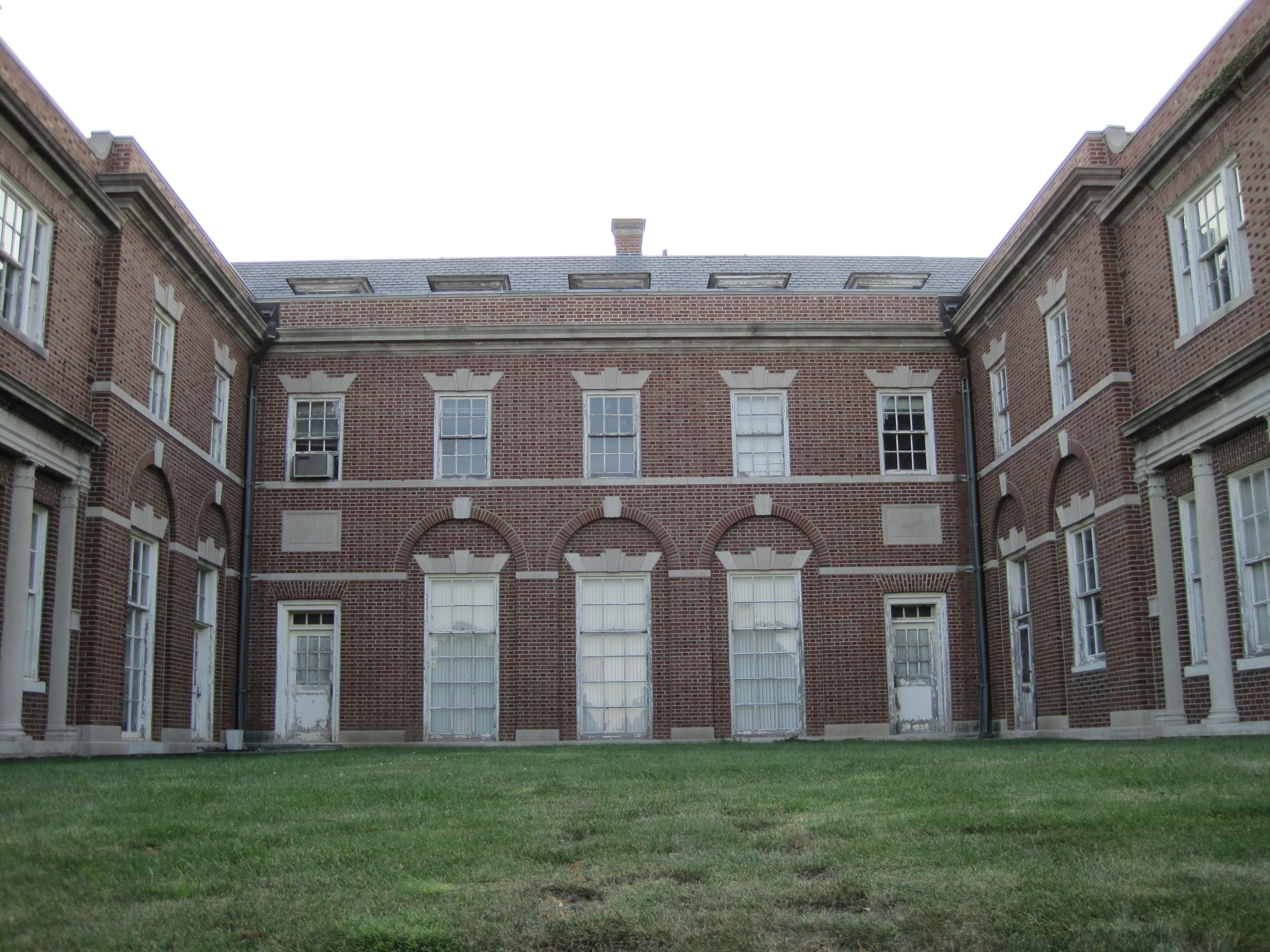

- Location within Illinois Location within the United States
- Location: Veterans Administration Medical Center, North Chicago, Illinois
- Coordinates: 42°18′13″N 87°51′34″W
- Area: 0.8 acres (0.32 ha)
- Built: 1914
- Architect: David Adler
- Architectural style: Georgian Revival
- NRHP reference No.: 85001008
- Added to NRHP: May 8, 1985

The Dewey House, also referred to as Building 29, North Chicago VA Medical Center, is a historic building at the Captain James A. Lovell Federal Health Care Center in North Chicago, Illinois. Designed by David Adler, the Georgian Revival mansion was commissioned by future United States Representative Charles S. Dewey.

== History ==
Charles S. Dewey, a real estate developer who would later be elected to the United States House of Representatives, commissioned David Adler to design the building in 1913. Dewey came to know Adler as he designed houses for two family friends. It was built down the road from the Naval Station Great Lakes, where Dewey was stationed during World War I. Dewey named the house "Over Yonder" and requested that it be designed in the Georgian Revival style. Completed in 1914, the Dewey family lived in the mansion until 1918.

While Dewey was stationed aboard the USS Mississippi, his house was claimed by the government through eminent domain in an effort to expand the naval base. Dewey's wife was forced to evacuate the house by the end of the year. In 1921, the Deweys were awarded a compensation of $192,950 for the acquisition of the land. Later that year, the United States Department of Veterans Affairs was established and, on April 17, 1924, the property was transferred to the agency. When the Captain James A. Lovell Federal Health Care Center was established, the Dewey House became known as Building 29 on the campus. The hospital split the former Dewey House into ten apartments for personnel.

The National Park Service determined that Dewey House was eligible for the National Register of Historic Places on August 8, 1980. The building was listed on the register on May 8, 1985.
