= Robert Twyman =

American politician (1897–1976)

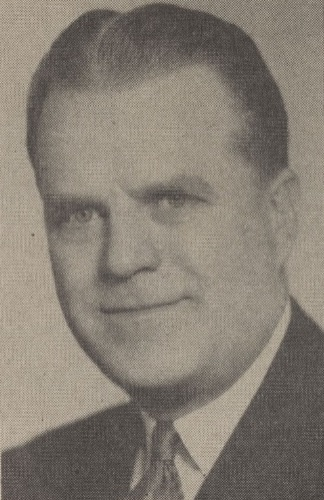
- From 1947's Pictorial Directory of the 80th Congress

Member of the U.S. House of Representatives from Illinois's 9th district
- In office January 3, 1947 – January 3, 1949
- Preceded by: Alexander J. Resa
- Succeeded by: Sidney R. Yates

Personal details
- Born: June 18, 1897 Indianapolis, Indiana, U.S.
- Died: June 28, 1976 (aged 79) West Palm Beach, Florida, U.S.
- Party: Republican

Robert Joseph Twyman (June 18, 1897 – June 28, 1976) was a U.S. representative from Illinois.

Born in Indianapolis, Indiana, Twyman attended Georgetown University, Washington, D.C. He was employed in foreign service by the Department of State. During the First World War served as an ensign in the United States Navy. He was employed by a public utility company in Guatemala in 1919. Accepted a commission in the United States Navy in February 1941 and served until September 1945. He was president of the Thomas Hoist Company, a supplier of construction and industrial lifts.

Twyman was elected as a Republican to the Eightieth Congress (January 3, 1947 – January 3, 1949), defeating the first-term organization Democrat by a bare three points. He was redistricted in 1947, which increased the population of his district by half. His opponent was a reform Democrat in 1948, who defeated Twyman by eleven points. Twyman announced his candidacy in 1950, then withdrew after five days and apparently never ran for office again.

In the House Twyman sponsored a bill to create a stamp honoring Swedish-Americans. For his efforts he was awarded a medal from the Swedish government in 1949. He resumed business interests until retirement. He died in West Palm Beach, Florida, June 28, 1976. He was interred in Rosehill Cemetery in Chicago.

U.S. House of Representatives
| Preceded by Alexander J. Resa | Member of the U.S. House of Representatives from Illinois's 9th congressional district 1947 – 1949 | Succeeded by Sidney R. Yates |
