= Alexander J. Resa =

American politician (1887–1964)

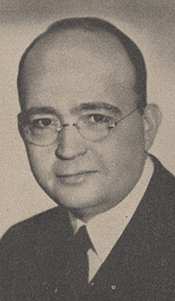

Member of the U.S. House of Representatives from Illinois's 9th district
- In office January 3, 1945 – January 3, 1947
- Preceded by: Charles S. Dewey
- Succeeded by: Robert Twyman

Personal details
- Born: August 4, 1887 Chicago, Illinois
- Died: July 4, 1964 (aged 76) Evanston, Illinois
- Party: Democratic

Alexander John Resa (August 4, 1887 – July 4, 1964) was a U.S. Representative from Illinois.

Born in Chicago, Illinois, Resa attended the public schools of Chicago, Illinois, and St. Joseph's College, Kirkwood, Missouri. He was graduated from the John Marshall Law School, Chicago, Illinois, in 1911. He was admitted to the bar the same year and commenced practice in Chicago, Illinois. He was assistant corporation counsel of the city of Chicago, serving as head of the appeals division and public improvement division 1937–1944. He served as member of the faculty of the John Marshall Law School 1918–1942.

Resa was elected as a Democrat to the Seventy-ninth Congress (January 3, 1945 – January 3, 1947). He was an unsuccessful candidate for reelection in 1946 to the Eightieth Congress. He returned to practice of law and retired December 31, 1959. He died in Evanston, Illinois, July 4, 1964. He was interred in Calvary Cemetery.

U.S. House of Representatives
Preceded by Charles S. Dewey	Member of the U.S. House of Representatives from Illinois's 9th congressional district 1945 – 1947	Succeeded by Robert Twyman
