= Captain James A. Lovell Federal Health Care Center =

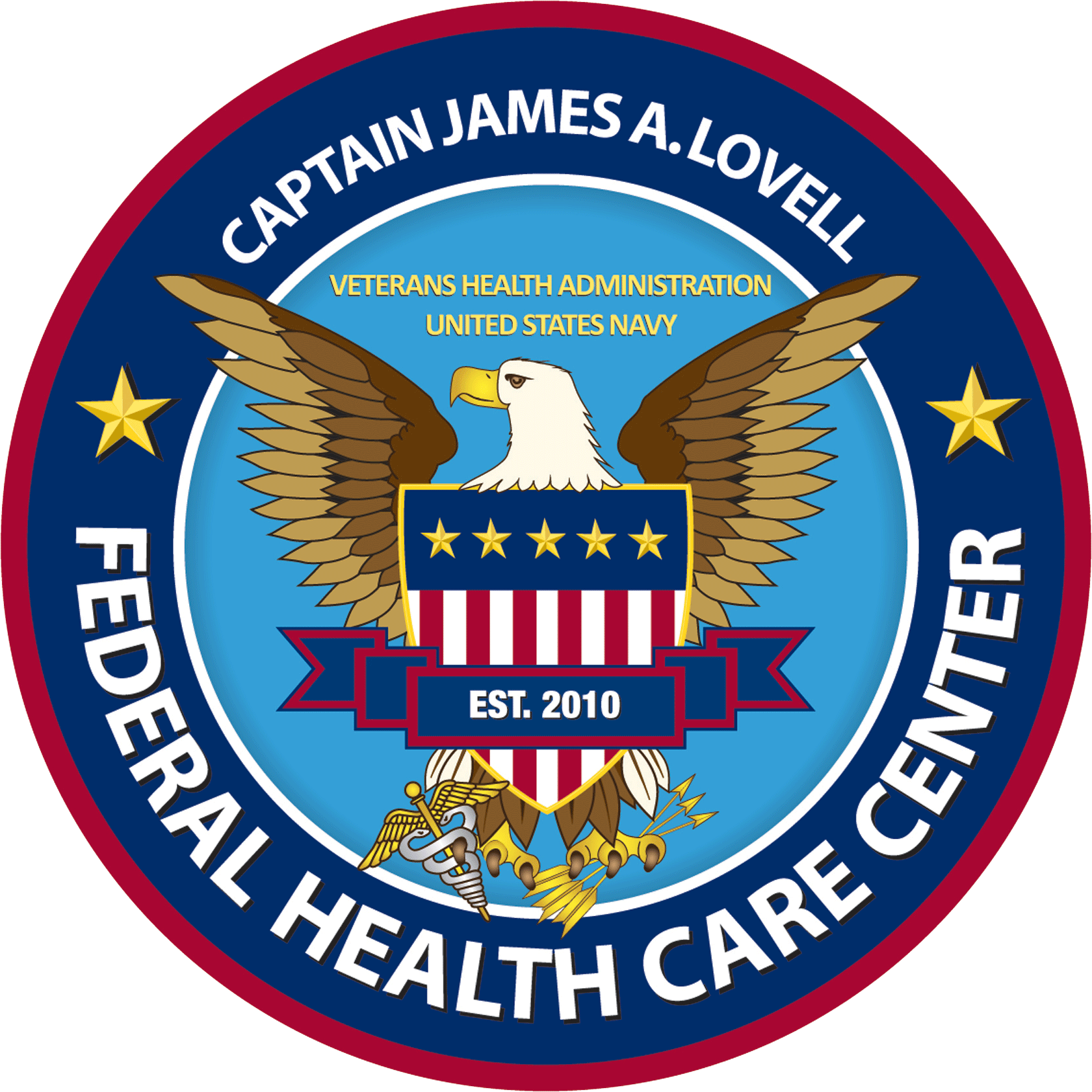

Geography
- Location: North Chicago, Illinois, United States
- Coordinates: 42°18′25″N 87°51′39″W

Organization
- Care system: Department of Veterans Affairs and Department of Defense
- Type: Federal health care center (medical)
- Affiliated university: Rosalind Franklin University of Medicine and Science

Services
- Emergency department: Comprehensive emergency center

History
- Founded: October 1, 2010; 16 years ago

Links
- Website: www.lovell.fhcc.va.gov
- Lists: Hospitals in Illinois

The Captain James A. Lovell Federal Health Care Center (FHCC), opened on October 1, 2010, and is the United States' first federal health care center that partners the United States Department of Veterans Affairs and the Department of Defense into a single, fully integrated federal health care facility for both active duty and retired enrollees.

== Location ==
The medical center is located in North Chicago, Illinois, and is on the grounds of the former North Chicago VA Medical Center, opened on 1 March 1926. During the years from 1928 to 1939, an additional six buildings were constructed. In 1939, the hospital was renamed the Downey Veteran Administration Hospital. In 1976, the hospital reverted to its original North Chicago Veterans Affairs Medical Center name.

The arrangement incorporates facilities and services from both the former North Chicago VA Medical Center and the former Naval Health Clinic Great Lakes, a part of Naval Station Great Lakes.

The center is a system of facilities throughout Northeastern Illinois and Southern Wisconsin that provide medical and dental services to U.S. military veterans, recruits, active duty and eligible beneficiaries.

== History ==
The merger was accomplished in three phases and is named in honor of Apollo 13 astronaut, Captain James A. Lovell, USN.

The Base Realignment and Closure committee's recommendations of 1995, Executive Order 13214 of 2001 (Presidential Task Force to Improve Healthcare Delivery for our Nation's Veterans), the Capital Asset Realignment for Enhancement Services (CARES) study of 2001, the Center for Naval Analysis recommendations of 2002, and Congressional support drove the integration of these two federal departments.

The unique partnership began in October 2002, when the Veterans Health Administration and the DoD signed an Executive Council Decision Memo, directing the partnership between the two medical centers. The first phase of the partnership began in October 2003, when the U.S. Navy shifted their inpatient mental health care to the North Chicago VAMC. The initial phase was completed in December 2004 when the Department of the Navy moved their Blood Donor Center, and collection efforts from B200H (former Naval Hospital Great Lakes) to North Chicago VAMC. Patrick Sullivan resided over the commissioning of the Blood Donor Processing Division as director of the North Chicago VA Medical Center. This signaled the completion of the first phase of the DOD and DVA integration.

Phase II of the partnership included a $13 million VA renovation and modernization project to expand the Emergency and Surgery Departments at the North Chicago VAMC. As part of this phase, the U.S. Navy transferred all operating room, intensive care unit and emergency room services to the VA, including pediatrics. The North Chicago VA Medical Center is the only Veterans Affairs facility to offer pediatrics. In addition, all NHCGL inpatient medical, surgical and services were transferred to the North Chicago VAMC. This phase was completed in June 2006.

Phase III included a $130 million DoD construction project to build a new 201,000-square-foot (18,700 m^{2}) ambulatory care center next to the North Chicago VAMC, renovation of more than 45,000 square feet (4,200 m^{2}) of existing space, and a new parking garage and surface parking area. This phase was completed in December 2010.

== Beneficiaries ==
The design of the medical center allows for medical care for military veterans, active-duty military members, their families, and TRICARE-eligible retirees.

== Leadership ==
The center is led by a Veterans Affairs Senior Executive Services Officer as Director, and a U.S. Navy Captain as Deputy Director.
