= Carl Vinson =

American politician (1883–1981)

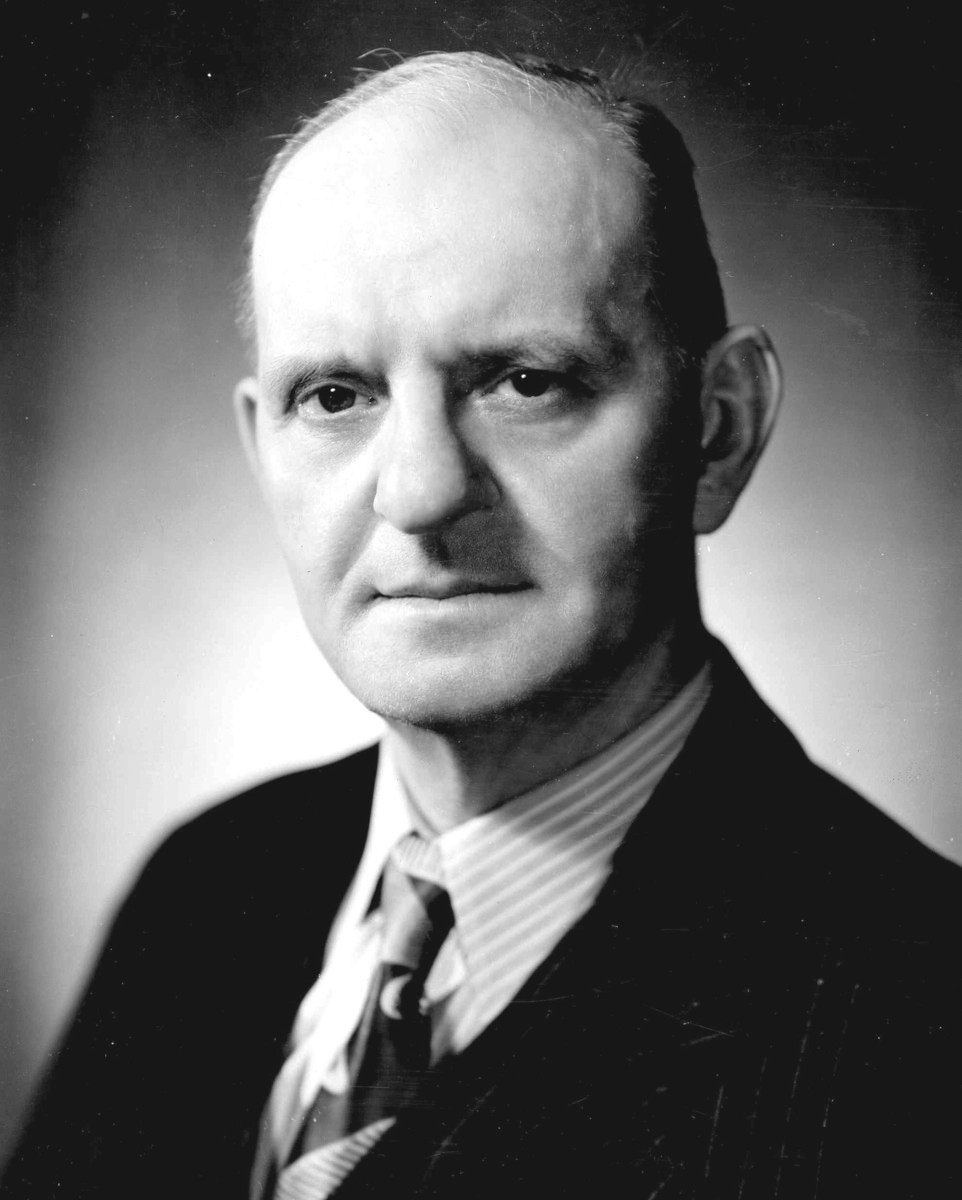

38th Dean of the United States House of Representatives
- In office November 16, 1961 – January 3, 1965
- Preceded by: Sam Rayburn
- Succeeded by: Emanuel Celler

Chair of the House Armed Services Committee
- In office January 3, 1955 – January 3, 1965
- Speaker: Sam Rayburn; John William McCormack
- Preceded by: Dewey J. Short
- Succeeded by: L. Mendel Rivers
- In office January 3, 1949 – January 3, 1953
- Speaker: Sam Rayburn
- Preceded by: Walter G. Andrews
- Succeeded by: Dewey J. Short

Member of the U.S. House of Representatives from Georgia
- In office November 3, 1914 – January 3, 1965
- Preceded by: Thomas W. Hardwick
- Succeeded by: Robert Grier Stephens Jr. (redistricting)
- Constituency: 10th district (1914–1933); 6th district (1933–1965)

Member of the Georgia House of Representatives from Baldwin County
- In office October 7, 1908 – October 2, 1912
- Preceded by: Edward R. Hines
- Succeeded by: J. Howard Ennis

Personal details
- Born: November 18, 1883 Baldwin County, Georgia, U.S.
- Died: June 1, 1981 (aged 97) Milledgeville, Georgia, U.S.
- Party: Democratic
- Education: Mercer University (LLB)

Carl Vinson (November 18, 1883 – June 1, 1981) was an American politician who served in the U.S. House of Representatives for over 50 years and was influential in the 20th century expansion of the U.S. Navy. He was a member of the Democratic Party and represented Georgia in the House from 1914 to 1965. He was known as "The Father of the Two-Ocean Navy". He is the longest-serving member of the United States House of Representatives from the state of Georgia. From 1961 to 1965, he served as the dean of the US House of Representatives as the longest serving member of the body.

USS Carl Vinson, the third Nimitz-class aircraft carrier, is named after him.

== Early years ==
Vinson was born in Baldwin County, Georgia, where he attended local schools and Georgia Military College. He graduated with a law degree from Mercer University in 1902 and was a member of the Kappa Alpha Order. After some years of practice, he was elected to the Georgia House of Representatives in 1908. After losing a third term following redistricting, he was appointed as judge of the Baldwin County court.

Following the sudden death of U.S. senator Augustus Bacon, Representative Thomas W. Hardwick of Georgia's 10th congressional district was nominated to fill Bacon's Senate seat. Vinson announced his candidacy for Hardwick's seat in Congress and defeated three opponents. He was the youngest member of Congress (30 years old) when he was elected on November 3, 1914.

== Service in Congress ==
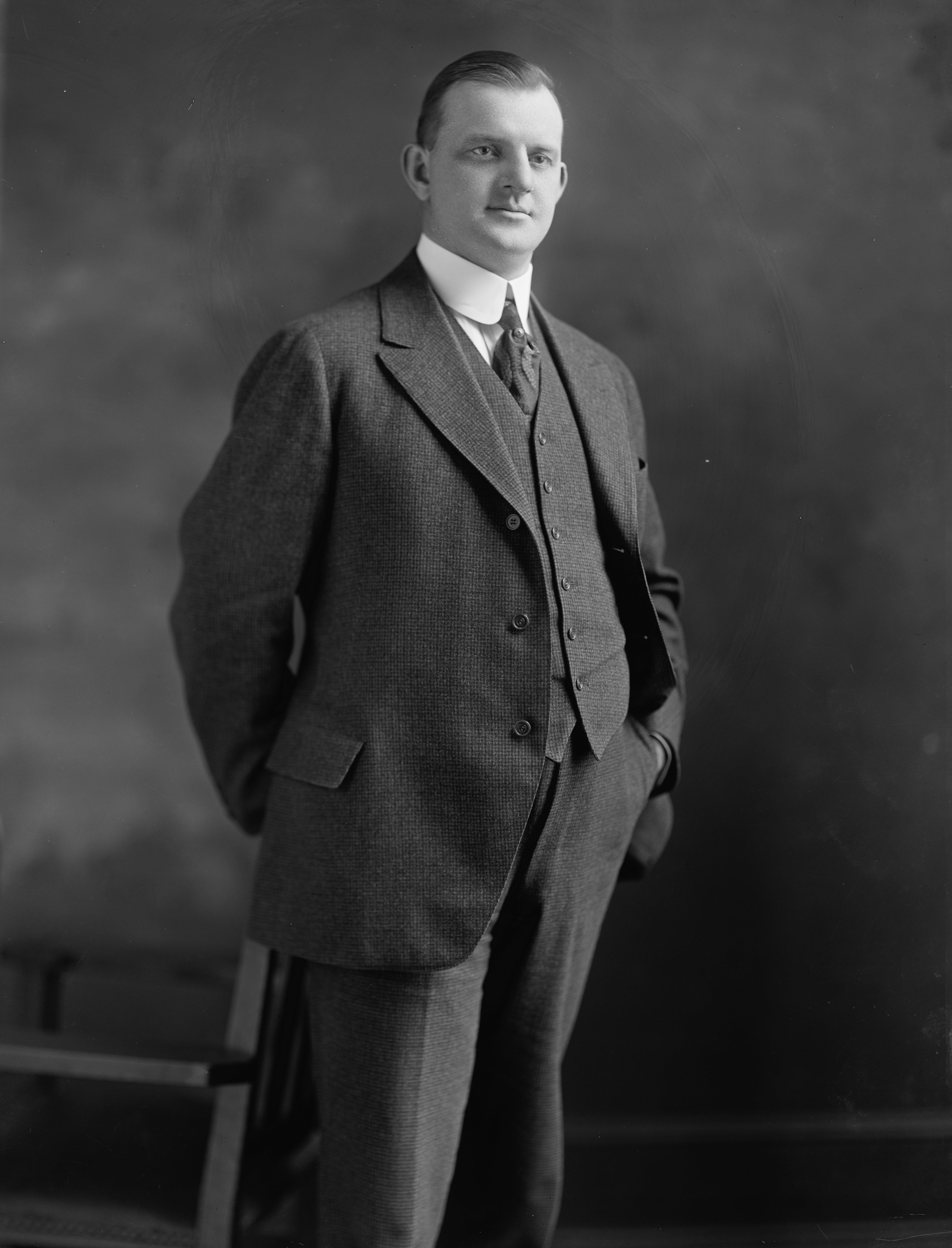
Carl Vinson was elected as a representative at age 30. A Democrat, he was repeatedly re-elected, serving until age 81.

Vinson served as a Representative from November 3, 1914, to January 3, 1965. He was repeatedly re-elected by Democratic voters for this seat. Vinson's first term in Congress was characterized by his support for segregation sponsoring bills to establish separate street cars and apartments for Blacks in the District of Columbia, banning interracial marriage in the District, and repealing the Fifteenth Amendment.

During his tenure in the U.S. House, Vinson was a champion for national defense and especially the U.S. Navy and the U.S. Marine Corps. He joined the House Naval Affairs Committee shortly after World War I and became the ranking Democratic member in the early 1920s. He was the only Democrat appointed to the Morrow Board, which reviewed the status of aviation in America in the mid-1920s.

In 1931, Vinson became chairman of the House Naval Affairs Committee. In 1934, Vinson helped push the Vinson–Trammell Act, along with Democratic senator Park Trammell of Florida. The bill authorized the replacement of obsolete vessels by new construction and a gradual increase of ships within the limits of the Washington Naval Treaty of 1922 and London Naval Treaty of 1930. Initial funding for the Vinson–Trammell Navy Act was provided by the Emergency Appropriations Act of 1934. This was necessary, as per the Naval History and Heritage Command (the U.S. Navy’s historical office), relatively few major warships were laid down in the US Navy during the Hoover administration, and the US Navy was both aging and losing ground to the Japanese Navy. Japan repudiated the naval treaties in late 1934.

Vinson later was primarily responsible for additional naval expansion legislation, the Naval Act of 1938 ("Second Vinson Act") and the Third Vinson Act of 1940 (which was essentially a mere prelude to the Two-Oceans Act that followed a month later), as well as the Two-Ocean Navy Act of 1940. The ambitious program called for by this series of laws helped the U.S. Navy as the country entered World War II, as new ships were able to match the latest ships from Japan.

At the end of World War II, Congress had authorized four Naval four-star officers to be promoted to Fleet Admiral. A staunch partisan of Admiral William Halsey, Jr., Vinson blocked the nomination of Admiral Raymond A. Spruance several times, although the majority thought him more deserving, to ensure that Halsey got the fourth billet. Congress eventually responded by passing an unprecedented act that specified that Spruance would remain on a full admiral's pay once retired until his death.

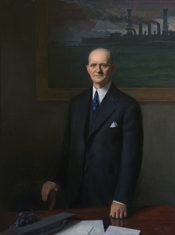
Portrait of Vinson, 1943.

Following World War II, the House Naval Affairs Committee was merged with the Military Affairs Committee to become the House Armed Services Committee (this consolidation mirrored the establishment of the Department of Defense when the old Departments of War and of the Navy were consolidated). When the Republicans won control of Congress in the 1946 election, Vinson served as ranking minority member of the committee for two years before becoming chairman in early 1949, when the Democrats were again in majority; a position held for four years until the Republicans briefly returned to the majority for a single congressional term after the 1952 elections. After the Democrats retook congress in the 1954 midterms, Vinson again became chairman, a position he held until his retirement in 1965. In this role, Vinson adopted a committee rule that came to be known as the "Vinson rule", which limited the number of questions a junior member of the committee could ask to one question per year of service on the committee. As chairman, Vinson oversaw the modernization of the military as its focus shifted to the Cold War. He was also committee chair when Congress authorized the procurement of the first nuclear-powered aircraft carriers, starting with USS Enterprise (CVN-65) in the late 1950s.

A staunch segregationist, Vinson voted against the 1964 Civil Rights Act and in 1956, signed "The Southern Manifesto". Other Southern politicians signed this in resistance to the ruling by the United States Supreme Court in Brown v. Board of Education (1954) that segregated public education was unconstitutional, and that states needed to integrate their public schools.

While serving in Congress, Vinson accumulated a voting record that was predominantly liberal.

Vinson did not seek re-election in 1964 and retired from Congress in January 1965.

== Personal life ==
Vinson married Mary Green of Ohio in 1921. She died in 1949 after a long illness.

Vinson did not have children, but his great-nephew, Sam Nunn, served as a senator from Georgia for more than 24 years. Nunn followed in his great uncle's footsteps, serving on the Senate Armed Services Committee for nearly his entire tenure in the Senate. Sam Nunn's daughter, Michelle Nunn, ran unsuccessfully for one of Georgia's U.S. Senate seats in 2014.

Vinson considered his longtime assistant Charles Tillman Snead, Jr. his surrogate son, and Snead's wife, Molly Staeman Snead, was Vinson's wife's nurse for 34 years. Snead's son and grandchildren maintained this familial bond to Vinson until his death in 1981.

== Death ==
Vinson returned to Baldwin County, Georgia, where he lived in retirement until his death on June 1, 1981. He is buried in Memory Hill Cemetery in Milledgeville, Georgia.

At the time of his death, Vinson was the last living member of the House of Representatives who was serving at the time of the United States' declaration of war against the German Empire, which precipitated the United States' entry into World War I.

== Legacy ==
In recognition of his efforts on behalf of the U.S. Navy, a nuclear-powered aircraft carrier was named the USS Carl Vinson, an honor rarely given to a person while living. On March 15, 1980, at age 96, he attended the ship's launching.

Vinson Massif, Antarctica's highest mountain, is also named after him, together with the related Mount Vinson and Vinson Plateau.

Carl Vinson served 26 consecutive terms in the U.S. House, rarely running against significant opposition. He served for 50 years and one month, a record that stood until 1992, when the mark was surpassed by Jamie Whitten of Mississippi.

For his commitment, Vinson was awarded the prestigious Sylvanus Thayer Award by the United States Military Academy. In 1964, President Lyndon B. Johnson awarded Vinson the Presidential Medal of Freedom with Special Distinction, the highest award the President can give to a civilian. During his own tenure in the House, Johnson had served for years as a junior member of the House Naval Affairs Committee under Vinson.

The Department of Veterans' Affairs Medical Center in Dublin, Georgia, serving veterans in Central and Southern Georgia, is named for Vinson.

The University of Georgia hosts the Carl Vinson Institute of Government.

Athens, Georgia, is the site of Carl Vinson Park.

Carl Vinson Parkway is located in Warner Robins, Georgia.

Georgia Military College formerly had a barracks named for him. It was razed in the mid-2000s.

Vinson Hall Retirement Community in McLean, Virginia, is named after Carl Vinson.

US Federal Standard 595 names a color in his honor: reference 25630, "Carl Vinson Blue." The color can be approximated by hexadecimal color #B1C1C1

U.S. House of Representatives
Preceded by Thomas W. Hardwick	Member of the U.S. House of Representatives from Georgia's 10th congressional district November 3, 1914 – March 4, 1933	Succeeded by Charles H. Brand
Preceded by Carlton Mobley	Member of the U.S. House of Representatives from Georgia's 6th congressional district March 4, 1933 – January 3, 1965	Succeeded by John J. Flynt Jr.
Honorary titles
Preceded by Sam Rayburn	Dean of the House; 1961–1965	Succeeded by Emanuel Celler
Preceded by James F. Byrnes	Most senior living U.S. representative (Sitting or former); April 9, 1972 – June 1, 1981	Succeeded by Hamilton Fish III
Preceded by Charles S. Dewey	Oldest living U.S. representative (Sitting or former); December 27, 1980 – June 1, 1981	Succeeded by Elizabeth Hawley Gasque
Awards
Preceded by James B. Conant	Sylvanus Thayer Award recipient 1966	Succeeded by Francis Spellman
