= Dewey House (Hartford, Vermont) =

Historic house in Vermont, United States

- U.S. National Register of Historic Places
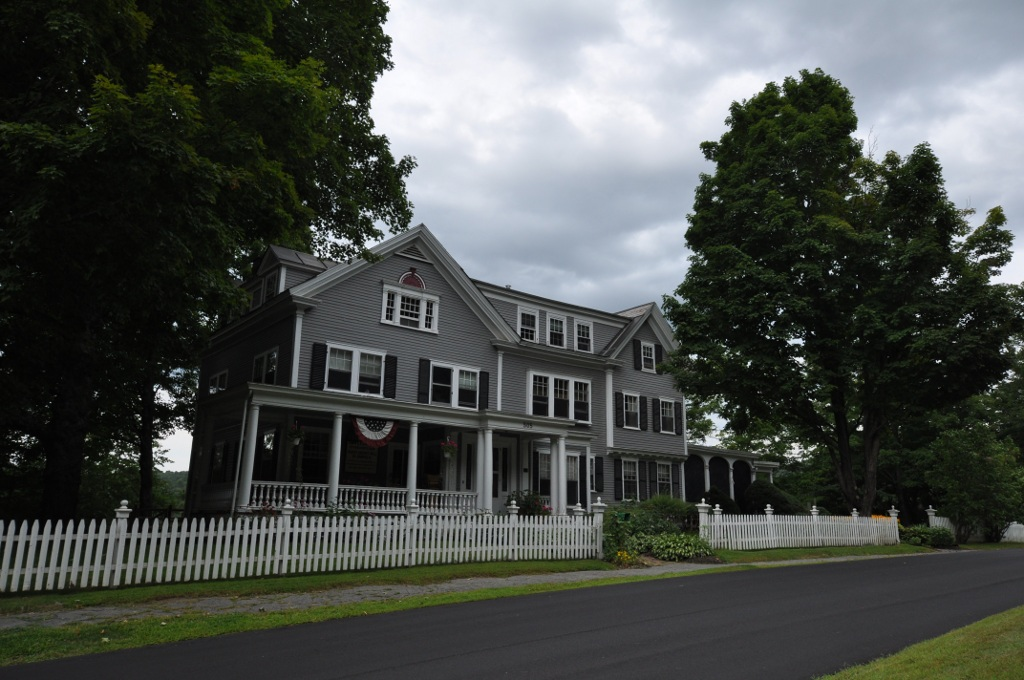

- Location within Vermont Location within the United States
- Location: 173 Deweys Mills Rd., Hartford, Vermont
- Coordinates: 43°38′30″N 72°24′19″W
- Area: less than one acre
- Built: 1903
- Architectural style: Colonial Revival
- NRHP reference No.: 99001051
- Added to NRHP: August 27, 1999

The Dewey House is a historic house at 173 Deweys Mills Road in Hartford, Vermont. Built in 1876 by a local mill owner, and remodeled in 1903, it is a high quality local example of residential Colonial Revival architecture. It was listed on the National Register of Historic Places in 1999.

== Description and history ==
The Dewey House stands on the northwest side of Deweys Mills Road, once a primary road between the Deweys Mills village and a railroad station that stood on the Woodstock road (now United States Route 4). It is a 2 1/2-story wood-frame building, with a complex roofline, clapboarded exterior, and a foundation of brick and fieldstone. The roof presents two gables to the front, joined by a shed dormer that descends from a roof ridge paralleling the street. The leftmost section of the house has a single-story porch across the front and wrapping around to the side, supported by Tuscan columns. A second porch extends from the right side. The left gable has a Palladian window at its center. The building interior is reflective of an early 20th century remodeling.

The oldest portion of the house, its leftmost section, was built in about 1876 as a 1 1/2-story Cape style house, by A.G. Dewey, owner of Dewey's Mills. The house affords a commanding view of both the nearby Ottauquechee River and the mill pond associated with his mills, which are no longer standing, demolished in the 20th century by the United States Army Corps of Engineers as part of the Hartland Dam project. A single-story ell, extending to its right, was also built at that time, and the house was enlarged by subsequent generations of Deweys to reach its present configuration. At the time of the house's listing on the National Register in 1999, it still belonged to Dewey's descendants.

== See also ==
- National Register of Historic Places listings in Windsor County, Vermont
