= Naval Act of 1938 =

1938 Act of the United States Congress

- Other short titles: Second Vinson Act
- Long title: An Act to establish the composition of the United States Navy, to authorize the construction of certain naval vessels, and for other purposes.
- Nicknames: Navy Construction Act of 1938
- Enacted by: the 75th United States Congress
- Effective: May 17, 1938

Citations
- Public law: Pub. L. 75–528
- Statutes at Large: 52 Stat. 401, Chap. 243

Codification
- Titles amended: 34 U.S.C.: Navy
- U.S.C. sections amended: 34 U.S.C. §§ 498, 498a, 498c–k, 749b

Legislative history
- Introduced in the House as H.R. 9218 by Carl Vinson (D-GA) on March 4, 1938; Committee consideration by House Naval Affairs, Senate Naval Affairs; Passed the House on March 21, 1938 (294–100); Passed the Senate on May 3, 1938 (56–28); Reported by the joint conference committee on May 4, 1938; agreed to by the House on May 11, 1938 (Agreed) and by the Senate on May 13, 1938 (Agreed); Signed into law by President Franklin D. Roosevelt on May 17, 1938

The Naval Act of 1938, known as the Second Vinson Act, was United States legislation enacted on May 17, 1938, that "mandated a 20% increase in strength of the United States Navy", allocating $1.09 billion (equivalent to $19 billion in 2024 relative to GDP inflation) for it. It represented the United States' response to the Japanese invasion of China, the German annexation of Austria and the disintegration of the naval treaty system established in 1922 when both Japan and Italy refused to sign the Second London Naval Treaty of 1936.

The act was sponsored by Carl Vinson, a Democratic Congressman from Georgia who was Chairman of the House Naval Affairs Committee. It updated the provisions of the Vinson-Trammell Act ("First Vinson Act") of 1934 and the Naval Act of 1936, which had "authorized the construction of the first American battleships in 17 years" (six battleships were authorised under the 1934 Act – BB-55 to BB-60), based on the provisions of the London Naval Treaty of 1930. The 1938 Act specifically authorised the construction of 105,000 tons of battleships (the first three Iowa-class ships were built under this authorisation), 40,000 tons of aircraft carriers (expended on Hornet), 68,754 tons of cruisers (expended on 4 Cleveland and 4 Atlanta-class light cruisers), 38,000 tons of destroyers and 13,658 tons of submarines (eight vessels were built under this authorisation – SS-204 to SS-211), together with various smaller vessels. It was followed by the Two-Ocean Navy Act of 1940.

== Extract of 17 May 1938 Act ==
"...In addition to the tonnages of the United States Navy as agreed upon and established by the treaties signed at Washington,… and at London,… the authorized composition of the United States Navy in under-age vessels is hereby increased by the following tonnages;

- (a) Capital ships, one hundred and five thousand tons…. Provided, that vessels of tonnages in excess of thirty-five thousand tons each may be laid down if the President determines … that the interests of national defense so require, in which event the authorized composition of the United States Navy of capital ships is hereby increased … making a total authorized underage tonnage of six hundred and sixty thousand tons;
- (b) Aircraft carriers, forty thousand tons, making a total authorized underage tonnage of one hundred and seventy-five thousand tons;
- (c) Cruisers, sixty-eight thousand seven hundred and fifty-four tons, making a total authorized underage tonnage of four hundred and twelve thousand five hundred and twenty-four tons;
- (d) Destroyers, thirty-eight thousand tons, making a total authorized underage tonnage of two hundred and twenty-eight thousand tons;
- (e) Submarines, thirteen thousand six hundred and fifty-eight tons, making a total authorized underage tonnage of eighty-one thousand nine hundred and fifty-six tons."

== The United States Navy fleet in 1938 ==
- 2 Lexington-class (70,000t)
- Ranger (15,000t)
- 2 Yorktown-class (40,000t)
- Wasp (15,000t)

total aircraft carrier tonnage: 140,000t

- 2 Pensacola, 6 Northampton, 2 Portland, 7 New Orleans, Wichita

total heavy cruiser tonnage: roughly 180,000t

- 9 Brooklyn-class (some under construction)
- 10 Omaha-class
  - Omaha and Milwaukee were over-age at this point as per the provisions of the London Naval Treaty
  - Cincinnati, Richmond and Concord would become over-age in 1941 and replacement keels could be laid down 3 years prior to that

total light cruiser tonnage: roughly 160,000t

- 48 1500-ton destroyers built to the limit (72,000t)
  - 8 Farragut, 18 Mahan, 4 Gridley, 8 Bagley, 10 Benham
- 13 1850-ton destroyers built to the limit (24,050t)
  - 8 Porter, 5 Somers
- 20 sub 3000-ton destroyers (32,040t) (category result of the Second London Treaty)
  - 12 Sims (1570t)
  - 8 Benson/Gleaves (1650t, under construction in FY38)

total modern destroyer tons: 128,090t

88 of 156 Clemson-class destroyers (exclusive of hull numbers 191, 192, 212, 238, 261, 262, 271, 272, 275 - 304, 306 - 335): 106,920t

Thus the only actual construction made possible by the act was the construction of Hornet (CV-8). Every other category of ships was already mandated to be built up over time to the maximum allowed under-age tonnage by the first Vinson Act of 1934. Older vessels could be retained in active service longer (a vessel that was over-age and allowed to be replaced had to be scrapped if it was in fact replaced) and the size to which to build up to eventually was now increased for destroyers, submarines and cruisers (cruisers could not have been commissioned before 1941 though without the 1938 act beyond the point of what tonnage would have been gained from legally scrapping CL-4 and CL-5).

== Implementation ==
Contracts suggest that USS Hornet (CV-8) and the first four Atlanta-class light cruisers were ordered immediately by the White House, with the remaining cruiser tonnage expended on 2 Cleveland-class light cruisers in both FY40 and FY41 ordered by congress as part of the regular schedule. Destroyer and Submarine procurement also appears to have progressed at regular levels with vessels continuing to be ordered by annual Defense Authorization Acts (under the category "Replacement of Naval Vessels", and not the category "Increase of the Navy").

Only two of the three authorized battleships and only eight destroyers were ordered in fiscal year 40. The increase in fleet strength was thus in part actual and short-term and in part nominal and medium-term.

== See also ==
- Washington Naval Conference
- Washington Naval Treaty

== Sources ==
- United States Congress. "Carl Vinson (id: V000105)". Biographical Directory of the United States Congress.
