= Two-Ocean Navy Act =

Law that increased the size of the United States Navy by 70%

- Other short titles: Vinson-Walsh Act
- Long title: An Act to establish the composition of the United States Navy, to authorize the construction of certain naval vessels, and for other purposes.
- Nicknames: Navy Construction Act of 1940
- Enacted by: the 76th United States Congress
- Effective: July 19, 1940

Citations
- Public law: Pub. L. 76–757
- Statutes at Large: 54 Stat. 779, Chap. 644

Codification
- Titles amended: 34 U.S.C.: Navy
- U.S.C. sections amended: 34 U.S.C. §§ 494-497, 498-498k

Legislative history
- Introduced in the House as H.R. 10100 by Carl Vinson (D-GA) on June 19, 1940; Committee consideration by House Naval Affairs, Senate Naval Affairs; Passed the House on June 22, 1940 (Passed); Passed the Senate on July 10, 1940 (Passed) with amendment; House agreed to Senate amendment on July 11, 1940 (Agreed); Signed into law by President Franklin D. Roosevelt on July 19, 1940

The Two-Ocean Navy Act, also known as the Vinson–Walsh Act, was a United States law enacted on July 19, 1940, and named for Carl Vinson and David I. Walsh, who chaired the Naval Affairs Committee in the House and Senate respectively. In what was then the largest naval procurement bill to date in U.S. history, it increased the size of the United States Navy by 70%.

== History ==
Modest naval expansion programs had been implemented by the Vinson–Trammell Act of 1934 and the Naval Act of 1938. In early June 1940, the U.S. Congress passed legislation that provided an 11% increase in naval tonnage as well as an expansion of naval air capacity. On June 17, a few days after German troops conquered France, Chief of Naval Operations Harold Stark requested four billion dollars from Congress to increase the size of the American combat fleet by 70%, adding 257 ships amounting to 1,325,000 tons. On June 18, after less than an hour of debate, the House of Representatives by a 316–0 vote authorized $8.55 billion (equivalent to $149 billion today) for a naval expansion program, that put emphasis on aircraft. Rep. Vinson, who headed the House Naval Affairs Committee, said its emphasis on carriers did not represent any less commitment to battleships, but "The modern development of aircraft has demonstrated conclusively that the backbone of the Navy today is the aircraft carrier. The carrier, with destroyers, cruisers and submarines grouped around it[,] is the spearhead of all modern naval task forces." The Two-Ocean Navy Act was enacted on July 19, 1940.

The Act authorized the procurement of:

- 8 Essex-class aircraft carriers
- 2 Iowa-class battleships
- 5 Montana-class battleships
- 6 Alaska-class large cruisers
- 4 Baltimore-class cruisers
- 13 Cleveland-class cruisers
- 4 Atlanta-class anti-aircraft cruisers
- 115 destroyers including 100 Fletcher-class, 13 Gleaves-class, and 2 Benson-class destroyers
- 43 Gato-class submarines
- 15,000 aircraft
- The conversion of 100,000 tons of auxiliary ships
- $50 million for patrol, escort and other vessels
- $150 million for essential equipment and facilities
- $65 million for the manufacture of ordnance material or munitions
- $35 million for the expansion of facilities

The expansion program was scheduled to take five to six years, but a New York Times study of shipbuilding capabilities called it "problematical" unless proposed "radical changes in design" were dropped.

== See also ==
- Washington Naval Conference
- Washington Naval Treaty
