= Green Bay Road Historic District =

Green Bay Road Historic District may refer to:

- Green Bay Road Historic District (Lake Forest, Illinois), listed on the National Register of Historic Places in Lake County, Illinois
- Vine-Oakwood-Green Bay Road Historic District, Lake Forest, Illinois, listed on the National Register of Historic Places in Lake County, Illinois
- Green Bay Road Historic District (Thiensville, Wisconsin), listed on the National Register of Historic Places in Ozaukee County, Wisconsin
