= Casa Amesti =

Historic house in Monterey, California, US

Coordinates: 36°35′51″N 121°53′45″W

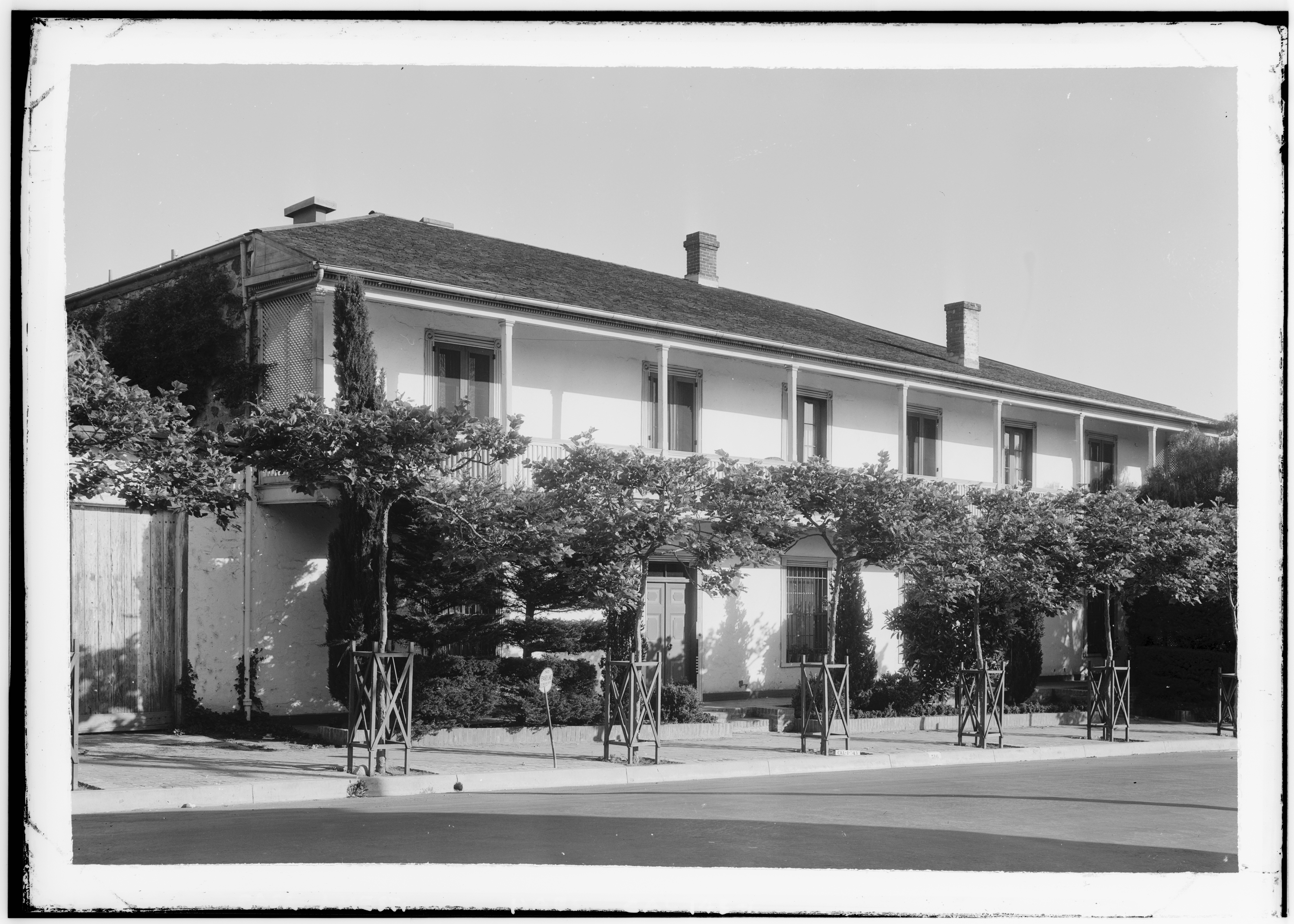
Casa Amesti, May 1936

Casa Amesti is a historic Monterey Colonial–style house and garden located at 516 Polk Street in Monterey, California, United States. Built in 1834, the house is named for the original owner and builder of the house, Jose Galo de Amesti, a Basque from Catalonia, Spain. The house was willed to the National Trust for Historic Preservation in 1953 by Frances Elkins who owned the house from 1918 through 1953.

== Description ==
Casa Amesti is located mid-block, facing Polk Street between Hartnell and Pearl Streets and backing up to Calle Principale in the historic center of Monterey, California. In August 1833, the Register of the City of Monterey recorded that a building site was granted to Jose Amesti with additional land requested and granted to Amesti's wife, Prudenciana Vallejo de Amesti, in February 1834. The date of the property's development is listed as 1834. Casa Amesti was among the houses built before California became a state in 1850.

=== Exterior ===
Casa Amesti Rear Garden, post 1933

Casa Amesti is a two-story balconied adobe of approximately 41.5 feet wide x 84 feet long built on a rough stone foundation. The building faces east with the length running north and south. The walls are made of adobe bricks which have been plastered and whitewashed. The front and rear of the house have balconies supported by redwood beams and the home has two brick chimneys, although early photos show as many as four. There are two doors on the street elevation and five French doors opening to the balcony on the second story.

The garden of Casa Amesti is a private area of 5,000 square feet surrounded by a stone wall. The landscape was a formal symmetrical design by the owner Frances Adler Elkins, her brother David Adler (a prolific Chicagoan architect), or both.

=== Interior ===
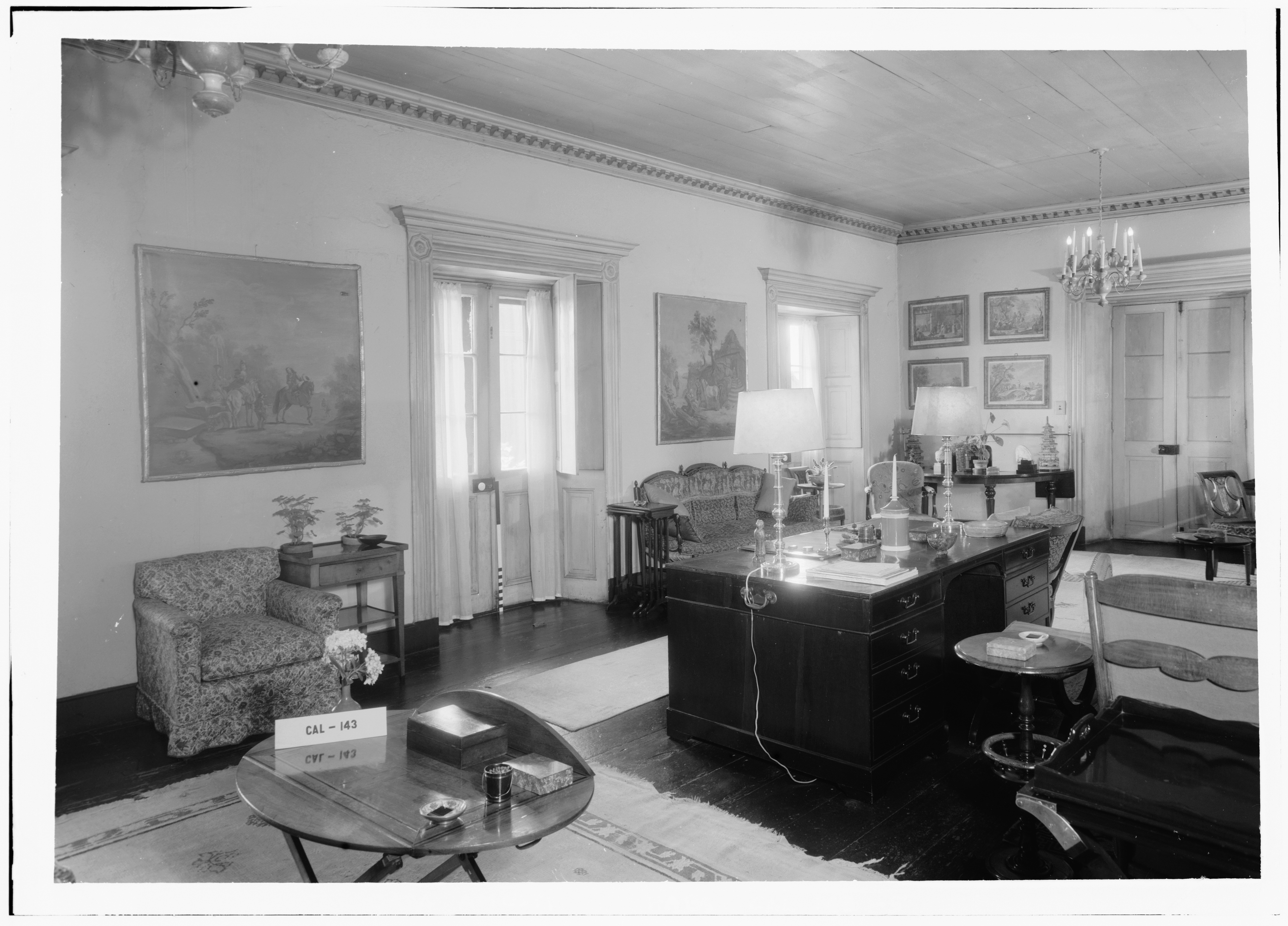
Interior View, Principal Room, September 1958

The floor plan is typical of California adobes with room to room circulation. An interior stairway rises from the entrance hall. Lower floors are concrete with quarry tile in the entry and redwood planking in other rooms. First floor ceilings are plastered and second floor ceilings feature random width-painted boards. The trim throughout the house is redwood. An inventory of the rooms and furnishings show the first floor rooms include a hall, library, and solarium and the second floor rooms include a hall, living room, dining room, and three bedrooms.

== History ==
Casa Amesti was built soon after Jose Amesti and his wife Prudenciana were granted the land in 1834. It started as a one story adobe with useable attic space and had increased in size to a one and a half story structure by 1842. A second story with balconies on the front and rear sides of the house was added sometime prior to the 1853 date of completion, which was recorded in the probate of the will of Jose Amesti who died in July 1855. Prudenciana continued to live in Casa Amesti until her death in 1883. After her death, Casa Amesti was willed to her oldest daughter Carmen until it was eventually sold by Carmen's son in law, Santiago J. Duckworth, in 1913.

=== Frances Elkins home ===
Noted interior designer Frances Adler Elkins and her husband Felton Elkins purchased Casa Amesti for $5,000 in 1918. With the help of Elkins' brother, Chicago architect David Adler, Casa Amesti was restored, and formal Italian gardens were designed within the adobe walls surrounding one side and the rear of the property. Elkins furnished the house with 1920s-era Spanish, Italian, and French style furniture, Chinese rugs, antiques, art, and decorator items, much of which remains in the house today. For thirty-five years, Frances Elkins lived in Casa Amesti until her death in 1953. In her will, Elkins bequeathed the house and its contents to the National Trust for Historic Preservation and in 1955, the property was legally transferred to the National Trust. However, the bequest did not include any endowment to maintain or restore the house, so the Trust found a local nonprofit private social and dining club to rent the building.

=== National Trust for Historic Preservation and the Old Capital Club ===
In 1957, the National Trust entered into a twenty-year occupancy agreement with the Old Capital Club in Monterey. The National Trust had no funds to maintain the house and the Club agreed to operate, maintain, and preserve the premises on behalf of the National Trust and to pay all expenses incurred. They also agreed to maintain the furnishings and decor of the home in a manner consistent with the home's character and to provide limited public access for the part of the house and the garden.

In the early 1980s, the National Trust was concerned that public access to the house was insufficient and they began new discussions with the Old Capital Club about a new ownership and stewardship arrangement. In 1995, new terms of a transfer of Casa Amesti to a newly created organization called the Casa Amesti Foundation, a 501(c)(4) nonprofit organization, were discussed with Elkins' daughter Katie Elkins Boyd and Elkins' grandson David Boyd, who retained a reversionary interest in the property.

To ensure that the property would be preserved and well maintained after leaving the National Trust's ownership, an easement was established whereby the owner, the Casa Amesti Foundation, would not demolish or subdivide the property and would maintain the property forever. While the easement was established to preserve the Monterey colonial architecture and the Elkins' style of decoration within the house, it also established public access to some of the historic rooms. To meet those terms, the house is offered on a holiday (Christmas) tour of the adobes in Monterey once a year by the Monterey State Historic Park Association.

=== Casa Amesti Foundation ===
On November 3, 2000, the transfer of the Casa Amesti ownership from the National Trust to the Casa Amesti Foundation was complete and the perpetual easement was signed January 25, 2001. The Foundation holds the title for the historic Casa Amesti adobe building and the Old Capital Club uses the Casa as a private club in return for maintaining the property and garden.
