= Lester Armour House =

- U.S. National Register of Historic Places
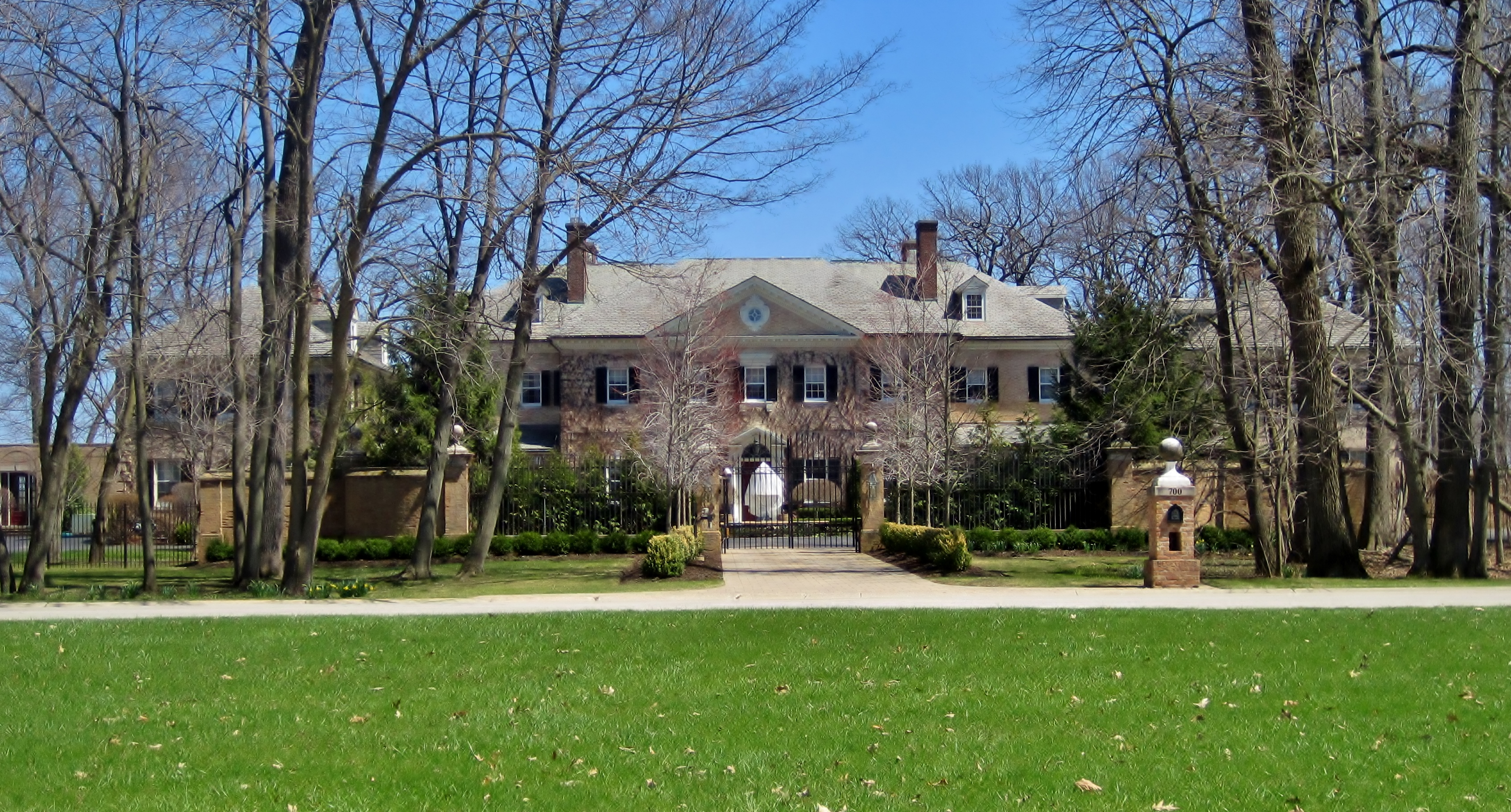
- Lester Armour House in 2014

- Location within Illinois Location within the United States
- Location: Sheridan Rd., Lake Bluff, Illinois
- Coordinates: 42°17′34″N 87°50′4″W
- Area: 5 acres (2.0 ha)
- Built: 1931
- Architect: David Adler
- Architectural style: Eclectic mix-18th-century American
- NRHP reference No.: 84001131
- Added to NRHP: May 3, 1984

The Lester Armour House is a historic mansion in Lake Bluff, Illinois, United States. It was designed by David Adler in 1931 and is considered one of his most pure works as well as one of his largest.

== History ==
Lester Armour was the son of Philip Danforth Armour, Jr., thus the grandson of meatpacking magnate Philip Danforth Armour, Sr. Lester Armour was born in 1895 and attended Yale University before joining Armour and Company, the family business. He married Leola Stanton in 1918; they had five children. In the early 1920s, he left the company to go into banking. He became president of the Chicago National Bank and was chairman of the board of Harris Bank. Armour later married Alexandra Galitzine, a Russian princess who was previously married to Prince Rostislav Alexandrovich of Russia.

Architect David Adler was a friend of Leola Armour. She probably recommended that Lester commission Adler to design the house. Adler designed the house in 1931 and the Armours approved the plans with no requested changes. As a result, the house is almost exactly as Adler intended it, making it one of his purest houses. The style of the house was probably inspired from Adler's recent trip with Evelyn Marshall Field along the James and Potomac Rivers. The resulting Armour house exhibits influence from the Colonial and Federal styles, consistent with early Virginia architecture. The Armour house was one of the few that Adler designed in cooperation with his sister, interior designer Frances Adler Elkins.

Lester Armour continued to live in the house following his divorce from Leola; in 1949 Alexandra Galitzine moved in. Lester Armour died in 1970. Alexandra continued to live in the house until 1977. That year, she rented the house out to Lionsgate Films to film the Robert Altman movie A Wedding, starring Desi Arnaz, Jr., Carol Burnett, and Mia Farrow. After filming, the estate, originally 73 acres (30 ha), was subdivided into fifteen lots of approximately 5 acres (2.0 ha). On May 3, 1984, the house was recognized by the National Park Service with a listing on the National Register of Historic Places.

Singer Richard Marx bought the house in 1997 for $4.7 million, and listed it for sale in 2014 for $18 million. The property was sold March of 2020 for $4.2 million to buyers unidentified.

== Today ==
As of 2025, it remains privately owned.
