= David Adler Estate =

Historic house in Illinois, United States

- U.S. National Register of Historic Places
- U.S. Historic district
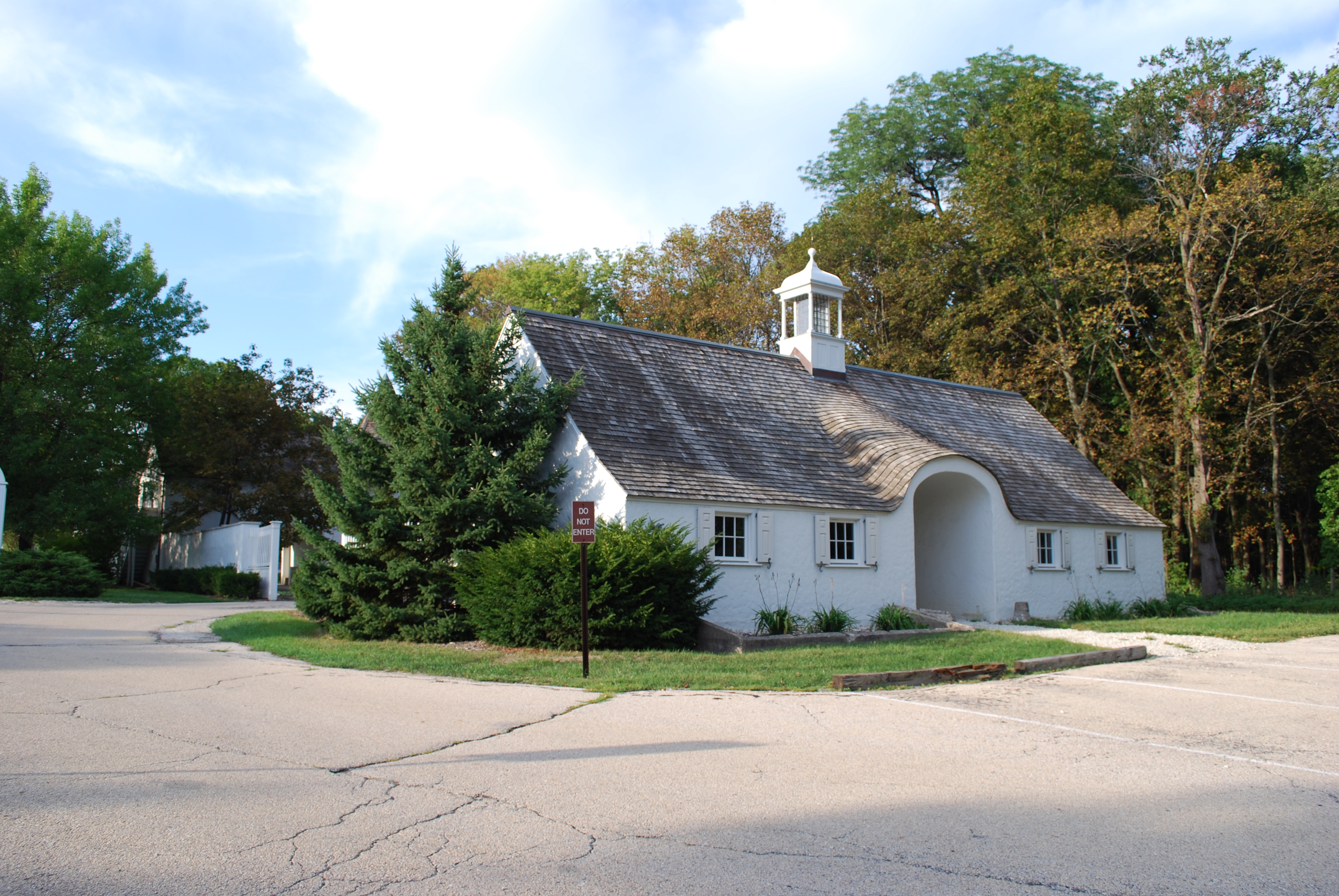
- The garage at the David Adler Estate

- Location within Illinois Location within the United States
- Location: 1700 N Milwaukee Avenue, Libertyville, Illinois
- Coordinates: 42.30237°N 87.95754°W
- Area: 11 acres (4.5 ha)
- Built: 1918
- Architect: David Adler
- Architectural style: Colonial Revival, Classical Revival
- NRHP reference No.: 99001380
- Added to NRHP: November 22, 1999

The David Adler Estate was the house and property of American architect David Adler in Libertyville, Illinois, United States. It is the house most closely associated with his life and career.

The house is now operated as the Adler Arts Center, which offers art and music classes, private lessons, camps, and exhibitions.

== History ==
David Adler was born in Milwaukee, Wisconsin in 1882 to wealthy clothier Isaac David Adler and Therese Hyman Adler. After graduating from Princeton University in 1904, he studied in Europe at the Technical University of Munich and École des Beaux-Arts. After completing his schooling in 1911, he moved to Chicago, Illinois to study under prominent country house architect Howard Van Doren Shaw. After six months, Adler opened his own architectural firm in partnership with Henry Dangler in Orchestra Hall.

When David Adler married Katherine Keith in 1916, he decided that they should have a new house. The pair had been living in an apartment in Chicago near Adler's main offices. Over the next two years, Adler remodeled an 1864 farmhouse in Libertyville, and the couple moved in in 1918. Libertyville was close to Lake Bluff and Lake Forest, the location of many of his commissions.

Although famed for his stately country houses, Adler decided to live in a more humble setting. However, the architectural themes that dominated Adler's country houses were present in the farmhouse remodel. The reformed farmhouse was an eclectic mix of styles, predominately Colonial Revival. Adler enclosed the southwest corner porch and connected to an addition that would become the living room. He added a room to the north that would be used as a dressing room and bath for his wife. Adler also extended the dining room in this direction with a projecting bay. He added a Neoclassical dining porch on the east which opened into the living room. At the same time as the initial remodel, Adler added a one-story servants' cottage. Adler also planned the landscape, designing a formal garden to the rear of the property.

Adler constantly experimented with his estate. Over the next thirty years, Adler made over 1300 sketches, documents, and drawings related to the property's design. In 1926, Adler added a five-bay garage with a dogtrot style opening. It serviced a new entrance road that was built to the south which then turned to the west to connect to Milwaukee Avenue. It is topped with a Georgian cupola. In 1934, Adler added a 1 1/2-story extension on the southeast, connecting the servants' quarters to a barn. He expanded the second story of the barn at this time to add more bedrooms and built open porches on the south side of the addition and barn.

The most extensive remodeling after 1918 came in 1941. Adler added a 1 1/2-story wing to the farmhouse connecting it to the servants' cottage and elevated the roof of the cottage. This created new rooms for a large sitting room and a new dining room. He also remodeled the bedrooms of the servants' cottage into a pantry and kitchen at this time.

=== Donation and restoration ===
David Adler died of a heart attack in his sleep in September 1949. The estate was passed to his sister, noted interior designer Frances Elkins. Elkins lived in Monterey, California and had little interest in maintaining a second property. Elkins decided to donated the property to the Village of Libertyville on the condition that it be used as a cultural and recreational center. The village was concerned about maintenance costs and initially would not accept the property. A non-profit organization called the David Adler Memorial Park Association formed in 1951 to rehabilitate the property. By 1956, when Elkins died, the organization had done so well to improve the property's value that the village purchased the house. The building was vacant until 1958, when the Libertyville Arts Center was given the building. The property was again renovated in 1971 by the Libertyville Junior Women's Club and in 1980 by the newly formed David Adler Cultural Center. Former Adler client William McCormick Blair helped to raise $250,000 for renovations and then provided an endowment for the property in his will. The David Adler Cultural Center continues to operate the property today. On November 22, 1999, the estate was recognized by the National Park Service with a listing on the National Register of Historic Places.

== Location ==
The David Adler Estate is in Libertyville, Illinois, roughly 35 miles (56 km) north of Chicago. The western facade faces Milwaukee Avenue (Illinois Route 21), a major north–south thoroughfare in the northern suburbs. The estate is just south of Buckley Road (Illinois Route 137). The estate is approximately 6 miles (9.7 km) west from Lake Bluff and Lake Forest. The original property purchase was for 17.67 acres (7.15 ha), which backed up to the Des Plaines River on the east. The house is near the Mrs. Isaac D. Adler House, which was designed by Adler for his mother in 1934.

== See also ==
- List of music museums
