= La Lanterne, Versailles =

Hunting lodge in Versailles, France

Coordinates: 48°48′14.6″N 2°5′32″E

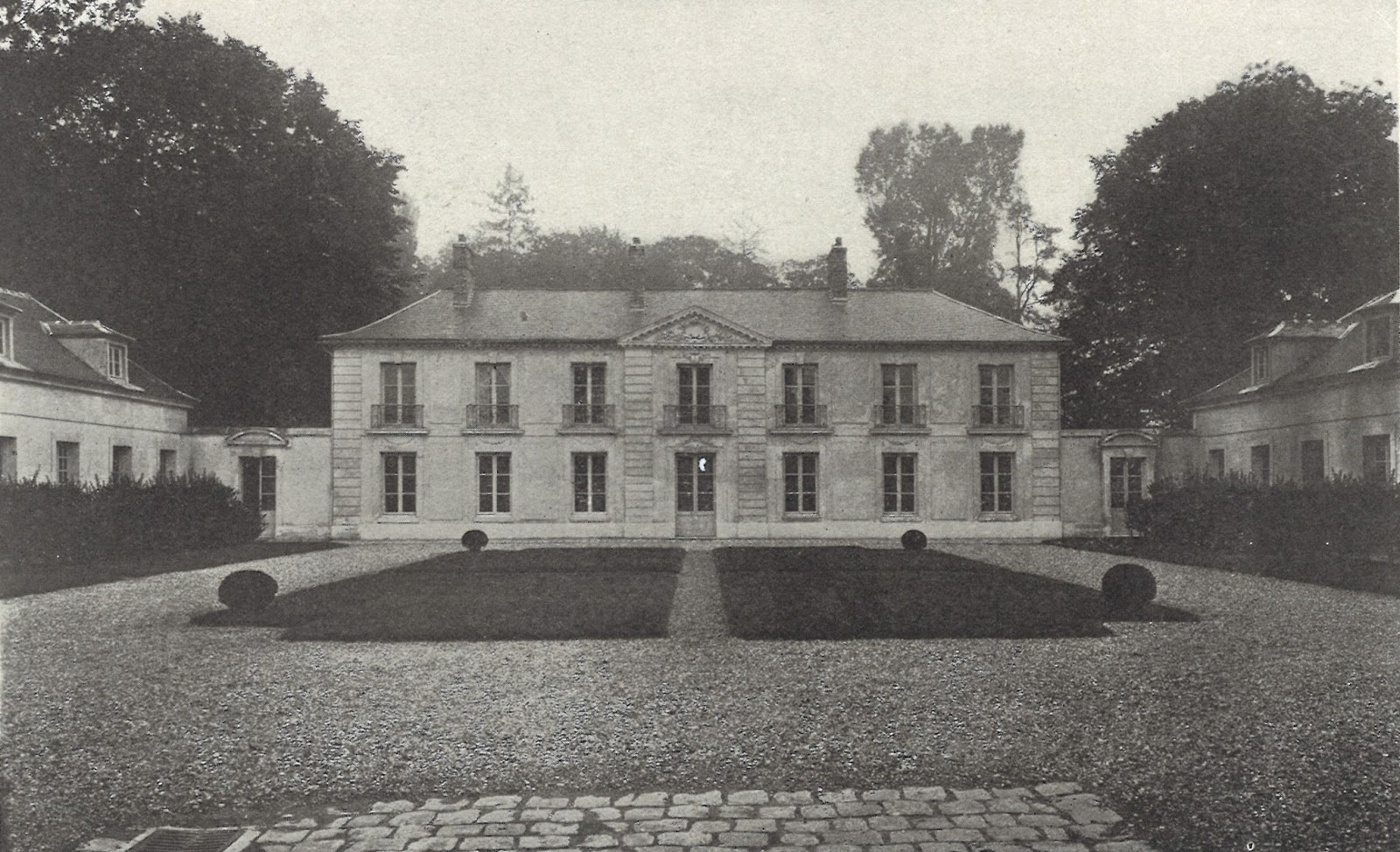
La Lanterne in 1926

La Lanterne (French pronunciation: [la lɑ̃tɛʁn]; English: The Lantern) is a hunting lodge in Versailles, France. Along with the Fort de Brégançon in Var, it is one of the two official retreats of the President of the French Republic.

The estate is adjacent to the Park of Versailles and situated on the road that links Versailles with Saint-Cyr-l'École. The estate includes a central two-story U-shaped building with a central section measuring 20 by 6 metres (66 by 20 ft). The central section is flanked by two parallel wings—of a later date and lower than the central section—which frame a gravel courtyard. A tree-lined lane links the courtyard with the Saint-Cyr road. The estate also includes a swimming pool, a tennis court, and five guest rooms.

== Location ==
It is located next to the Palace of Versailles, in the city of Versailles. It is four hectares wide, bordered by a tall wall and poplars, and it is forbidden to fly over the property. It takes 30 minutes by car to get there from the Élysée Palace, the official residence of the President of France.

== History ==
The Pavillon de la Lanterne, located on the border of the Ménagerie, was built in 1787 by Philippe Louis Marc Antoine de Noailles, prince de Poix, who was the captain of the hunt and governor of Versailles, and was offered to his father, the comte de Noailles, by Louis XV. Then it included a ground floor as well as an attic floor. The façades were ornamented with seven stucco decorated spans—six windows and one central door, which was surmounted by a pediment. Owing to the lack of archival information, the architect of this building is unknown.

Between 1785 and 1786, the 36 herms of the grille that separated the courtyard - and especially the two herms surmounted by deer heads - were restored. As with other buildings at Versailles, La Lanterne was given up during the Revolution. In 1818, Louis XVIII repurchased the estate. Between 1942 and 1943 the deer-headed herms of the entry grill were restored; and in 1994, a full restoration of the pavilion was executed.

From 1959 to 2007, it was the secondary residence of the Prime Minister of France. Michel Rocard, who served as Prime Minister from 1988 to 1991, commissioned a swimming-pool and a tennis court. Édouard Balladur, holding the office from 1993 to 1995, buried his dog in the garden. Lionel Jospin, Prime Minister from 1997 to 2002, together his wife Sylviane Agacinski, spent most weekends there. Dominique de Villepin, Prime Minister from 2005 to 2007, liked its extensive wine cellar. Since 2007, under President Nicolas Sarkozy, it was also used by the President of the French Republic. His wedding dinner to Carla Bruni took place there.

In December 2020, President Emmanuel Macron contracted the coronavirus during the COVID-19 pandemic in France. He decided to self-isolate at the former hunting lodge and continue working from there, starting on 17 December.

== Influence ==
Multiple American estates, including some named after La Lanterne, have drawn inspiration from La Lanterne.

- 1923 - Mrs. C. Morse Ely House An estate designed by David Adler in Lake Bluff, Illinois for Carolyn Morse Ely.
- 1929 - La Lanterne in Brookeville built by Horace Trumbauer for James Blanchard Clews. This replica was actually bigger than the original. The central portion of the house was destroyed in 1952, while the wings were each converted into separate residences. The original estate gates also still stand as the entrance to Clews Drive.
- 1931 - Ker Arvor in Newport, Rhode Island built by Clinton & Russell as the summer home of Snowden Andrews Fahnestock.
- 1938 - La Lanterne in Gladwyne built by Walter K. Durham with gardens by Umberto Innocenti for Barclay Warburton and Minnie Wanamaker Warburton

== Bibliography ==
- Patrice Machuret, Un long dimanche à Versailles : la République à la Lanterne (Seuil, 2010).
