= Mrs. Isaac D. Adler House =

Historic house in Illinois, United States

- U.S. National Register of Historic Places
- U.S. Historic district
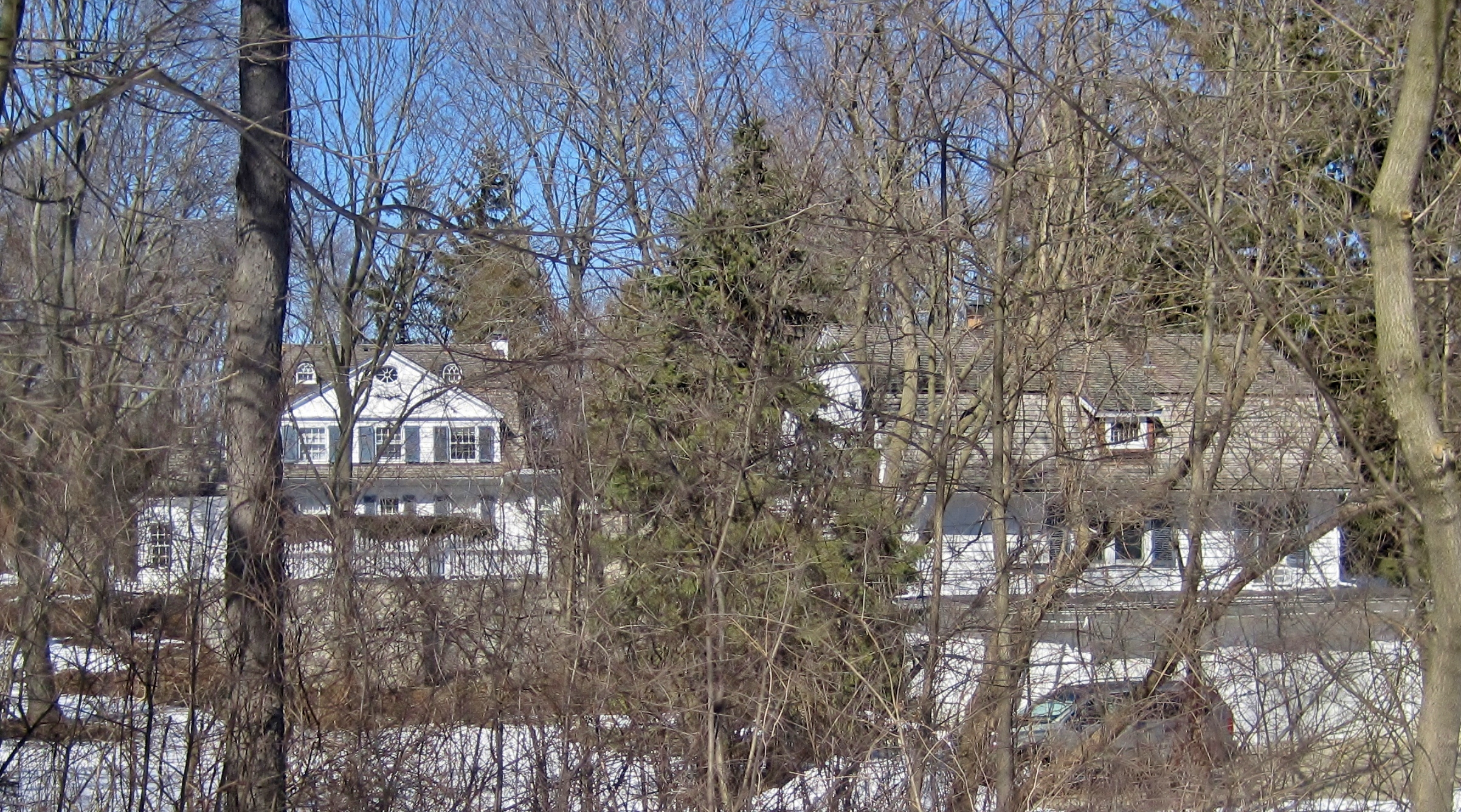
- The Adler house is on the left and the barn/garage is on the right

- Location within Illinois Location within the United States
- Location: 1480 N. Milwaukee Ave., Libertyville, Illinois
- Coordinates: 42°18′3″N 87°57′19″W
- Area: 3 acres (1.2 ha)
- Built: 1933
- Architect: David Adler
- Architectural style: Colonial Revival
- NRHP reference No.: 02000901
- Added to NRHP: August 28, 2002

The Mrs. Isaac D. Adler House was a property in Libertyville, Illinois, United States renovated and redesigned by architect David Adler for his mother Therese Hyman Adler.

== History ==
The original house on this lot in Libertyville, Illinois was built in 1914, when the Miller and Austin Subdivision was created. In 1930, Therese Hyman Adler, the widow of clothing wholesaler Isaac D. Adler and mother of architect David Adler, purchased this lot from Oscar D. and Anne F. Stern. The 14 1/2-acre (5.9 ha) property was adjacent to her son's estate. Mrs. Adler had been living in Chicago since 1925, when her husband died in a car accident. She may have lived in David Adler's apartment at 1240 North State Street. David Adler treated his mother's property as part of the estate, building a road between the two houses and coordinating a matching landscape.

David Adler extensively remodeled the house for his mother starting in January 1931. The original building was probably a Dutch Colonial. To this, Adler added a second porch on the west, adjusted window fenestrations, added a front pediment, and third-story dormers. The interior was left largely intact, although Adler did install a historic French fireplace and replaced the floors & staircase. The finished product was still largely Dutch Colonial, but showed heavy American Colonial influence. The house closely resembled a Sears Catalog Home design. Adler also extensively remodeled the garage/barn structure at the front of the property. He built a three-room apartment on the top floor and added a cupola. The final work on the property was completed in April 1934, when it was landscaped.

Mrs. Adler died in 1939 and the house passed to David. When David Adler died in 1949, the house was bequeathed to his sister, Frances Elkins. However, Elkins had a successful interior design practice in California and had little interest in the Illinois property. She let the Village of Libertyville use the property for recreational purposes, but the village struggled to maintain the costly property. In 1954 the house was sold to William Witort, who had been renting the property. Subsequent owners made few changes to the house. The road linking the house to her son's was expanded to Milwaukee Avenue in the 1970s and after the development of Carriage Hill to the south of the property, the private road was connected to a portion of the new public roadway Parkview Drive. The 3-acre (1.2 ha) property was recognized by the National Park Service with a listing on the National Register of Historic Places on August 28, 2002. It was listed as a historic district with four contributing properties: the house, the garage/barn, and two octagonal small buildings (a pump house and a tool shed).

In late 2024, the current owner of the property tore down the entire original house structure, and as of fall 2025, is in the process of building a new residence on the property. Prior to the removal of the original house, the property was delisted from both the National and the Illinois State Registers of Historic Places.
