= Helen Shedd Reed House =

Historic house in Illinois, United States

- U.S. National Register of Historic Places
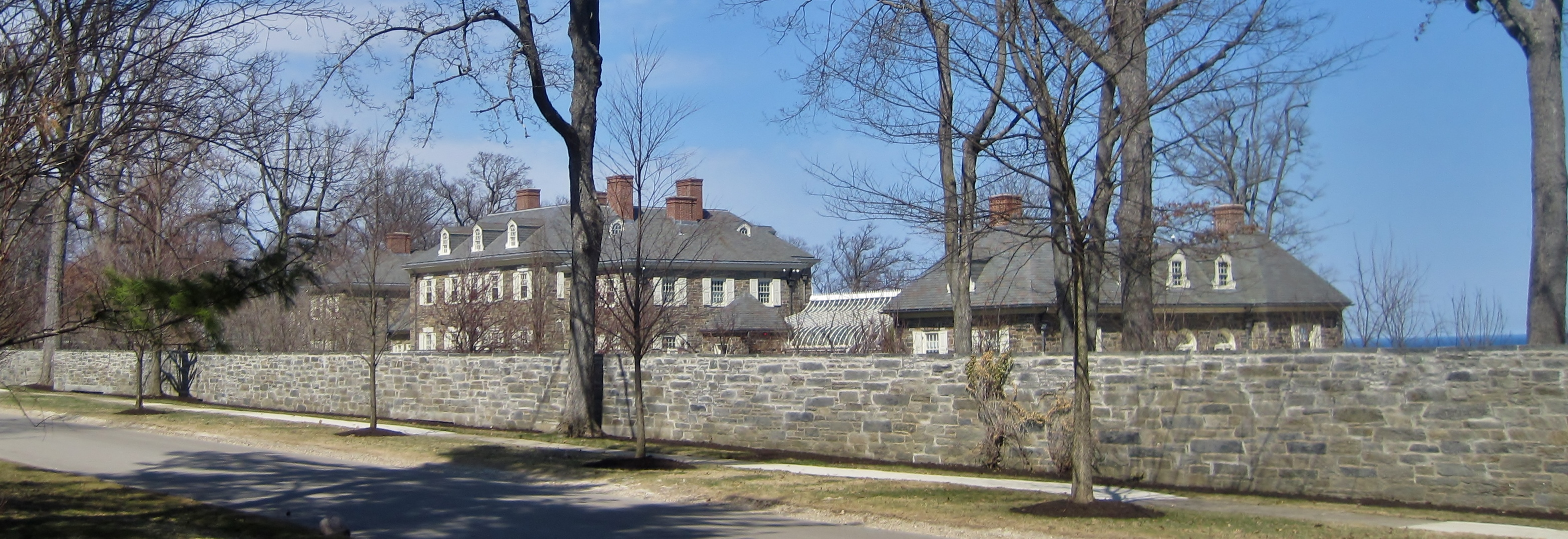

- Location within Chicago metropolitan area Location within Illinois Location within the United States
- Location: 1315 N. Lake Rd., Lake Forest, Illinois
- Coordinates: 42°15′47″N 87°49′38″W
- Area: 7 acres (2.8 ha)
- Built: 1931-32
- Architect: David Adler
- Architectural style: Georgian Revival
- NRHP reference No.: 01000178
- Added to NRHP: March 2, 2001

The Helen Shedd Reed House, also known as the Mrs. Kersey Coates Reed House, is a historic house at 1315 N. Lake Road in Lake Forest, Illinois. Built in 1931–32, the house was the home of Helen Shedd Reed and her children; it replaced a 19th-century house called Elsinore where Reed and her husband Kersey Coates Reed had lived until the latter's death in 1929. Architect David Adler, who was best known for his eclectic work, designed the house in the Georgian Revival style. The house is divided into a main section and a service wing and features five-bay facades on the main section, a transom and segmented arch above the entrance, marble detailing, and several dormers and chimneys. Frances Adler Elkins, a prominent designer and Adler's sister, designed the house's interior.

The house was added to the National Register of Historic Places on March 2, 2001.
