= President of France =

Head of state

President of the French Republic
- Président de la République française
- Diplomatic emblem of France, used by the presidency

- Presidential standard of France

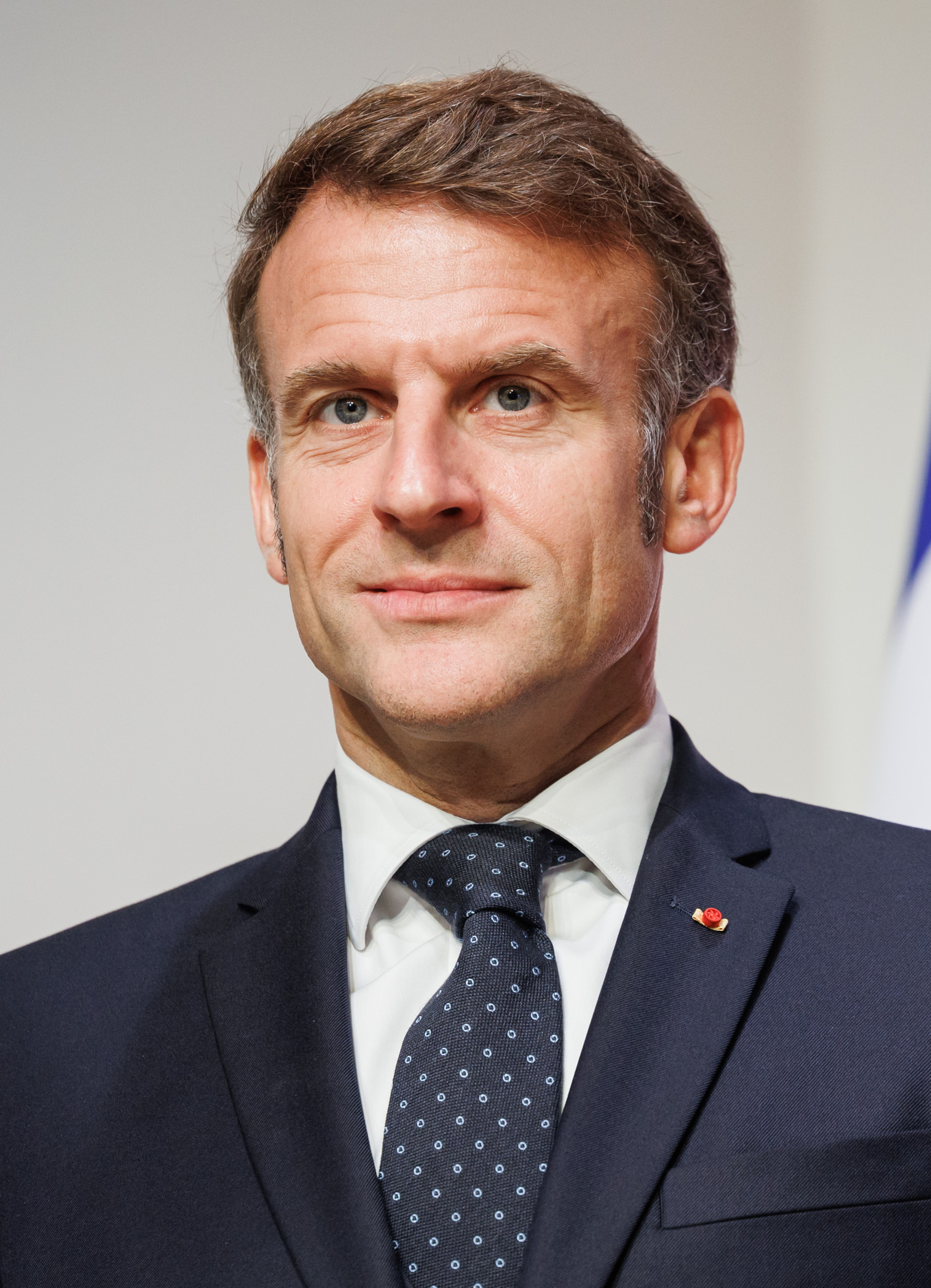
- Incumbent; Emmanuel Macron since 14 May 2017
- Executive branch of the French Government
- Style: Mr. President (informal); His Excellency (diplomatic)
- Status: Executive President; Head of state; Commander-in-chief
- Member of: National Defence and Security Council; European Council
- Residence: Élysée Palace
- Seat: Paris, France
- Appointer: Popular vote
- Term length: Five years; (renewable once consecutively)
- Constituting instrument: Constitution of France (1958)
- Precursor: King of the French (before 1848); Emperor of the French (1852–1870)
- Inaugural holder: Napoleon III (second French Republic); Charles de Gaulle (current fifth French republic)
- Formation: 20 December 1848; 177 years ago (Second Republic); 4 October 1958; 68 years ago (Fifth Republic)
- Deputy: President of the French Senate (in the presidential line of succession)
- Salary: €182,000 per annum
- Website: www.elysee.fr

The president of France (French: Président de la France), officially the president of the French Republic (French: Président de la République française) or president of the Republic (Président de la République), is the executive head of state of France, and the commander-in-chief of the French Armed Forces. As the presidency is the supreme magistracy of the country, the position is the highest office in France. The powers, functions and duties of prior presidential offices, in addition to their relation with the prime minister and government of France, have over time differed with the various constitutional documents since the Second Republic.

The president of France is the ex officio co-prince of Andorra, grand master of the Legion of Honour and of the National Order of Merit, and protector of the Institut de France in Paris. The officeholder is also honorary proto-canon of the Archbasilica of Saint John Lateran in Rome, although some have rejected the title in the past.

The current president is Emmanuel Macron, who succeeded François Hollande on 14 May 2017 following the 2017 presidential election, and was inaugurated for a second term on 7 May 2022 following the 2022 presidential election.

== History ==
The presidency of France was first publicly proposed during the July Revolution of 1830, when it was offered to the Marquis de Lafayette. He demurred in favour of Prince Louis Phillipe, who became King of the French.

Eighteen years later, during the opening phases of the Second Republic, the title was created for a popularly elected head of state, the first of whom was Louis-Napoléon Bonaparte, nephew of Emperor Napoleon. Bonaparte served as president until he staged a self-coup against the republic, proclaiming himself Napoleon III, Emperor of the French.

Under the Third Republic the president was at first quite powerful, mainly because the royalist party was strong when the constitutional laws of 1875 were established, and it was hoped that a member of one of the two branches of the royal family would be able to serve as president and turn France into a constitutional monarchy. However, the next legislature was dominated by Republicans, and after President Patrice de MacMahon had unsuccessfully tried to obtain a new royalist majority by dissolving the Chambre des Députés, his successor Jules Grévy promised in 1879 that he would not use his presidential power of dissolution, and therefore lost his control over the legislature, effectively creating a parliamentary system that would be maintained for 80 years until the accession of Charles de Gaulle as president in 1959.

Indeed, when the Fourth Republic was created, after the Second World War, it was a parliamentary system, in which the office of President of the Republic was a largely ceremonial one.

The Constitution of the Fifth Republic, adopted in 1958, greatly increased the president's powers. A 1962 referendum changed the constitution, so that the president would be directly elected by universal suffrage and not by the electoral college established in 1958. In 2000, a referendum shortened the presidential term from seven years (Septennat) to five years (Quinquennat). A maximum of two consecutive terms was imposed after a 2008 constitutional reform.

== Election ==
=== Term limits ===
Since the 1962 presidential referendum, the president has been directly elected by universal suffrage; previously, an electoral college decided the head of state. The length of the presidential term was reduced from seven years to five years following a 2000 referendum; the first election for a shorter term was held in 2002. Then-president Jacques Chirac was first elected in 1995 and again in 2002, and would have been able to run in 2007 had he chosen to, given the lack of term limits.

Following a further change, the constitutional law of 2008 on the modernization of the institutions of the Fifth Republic, a president cannot serve more than two consecutive terms. François Mitterrand and Jacques Chirac were previously the only presidents to date who have served a full two terms (14 years for the former, 12 years for the latter). Incumbent Emmanuel Macron is the fourth president (after de Gaulle, Mitterrand, and Chirac) to win re-election, having done so in 2022.

=== Electoral process ===
French presidential elections are conducted using run-off voting, which ensures that the elected president always obtains a majority: if no candidate receives a majority of votes in the first round of voting, the two highest-scoring candidates arrive at a run-off. After a new president is elected, they go through a solemn investiture ceremony called a passation des pouvoirs ("handing over of powers").

In order to be admitted as an official candidate, potential candidates must receive signed nominations (known as parrainages, for "sponsors") from more than 500 elected local officials, mostly mayors. These officials must be from at least 30 départements or overseas collectivities, and no more than 10% of them should be from the same département or collectivity. Furthermore, each official may nominate only one candidate.

There are exactly 45,543 elected officials, including 33,872 mayors. Spending and financing of campaigns and political parties are highly regulated. There is a cap on spending (at approximately €20 million) and government public financing of 50% of spending if the candidate scores more than 5%. If the candidate receives less than 5% of the vote, the government funds €8,000,000 to the party (€4,000,000 paid in advance). Advertising on TV is forbidden, but official time is given to candidates on public TV. An independent agency regulates election and party financing.

== Powers ==
The French Fifth Republic is a semi-presidential system. Unlike most other European heads of state, the French president is quite powerful. Although the Prime Minister of France, through their government as well as Parliament, oversees much of the nation's actual day-to-day domestic affairs, the French president wields significant influence and authority, especially in the fields of national security and foreign policy. The president's greatest power is the ability to choose the prime minister. However, since it is the French National Assembly that has the sole power to dismiss the prime minister's government, the president is forced to name a prime minister who can command the support of a majority in the assembly. The president also has the duty of arbitrating the functioning of governmental authorities for efficient service, as the head of state of France.

- When a majority of the Assembly has opposite political views to that of the president, this leads to political cohabitation. In that case, the President's power is diminished, since much of the de facto power relies on a supportive prime minister and National Assembly, and is not directly attributed to the post of president.
- When the majority of the Assembly sides with them, the president can take a more active role and may further influence government policy. The prime minister is then a more personal choice of the president, and can be easily replaced if the administration becomes unpopular. This device has been used in recent years by François Mitterrand, Jacques Chirac, and François Hollande.

Since 2002, the mandate of the president and the Assembly are both five years, and the two elections are close to each other. Therefore, the likelihood of a cohabitation is lower. Among the powers of the president:

- The president promulgates laws.
  - The president has a suspensive veto: when presented with a law, they can request another reading of it by the Parliament, but only once per law.
  - The president may also refer the law for review to the Constitutional Council prior to promulgation.
- The president may dissolve the French National Assembly.
- The president may refer treaties or certain types of laws to popular referendum, within certain conditions (among them the agreement of the prime minister or the Parliament).
- The president is the Chief of the Armed Forces.
- The president may order the use of nuclear weapons.
- The president names the prime minister. In theory, they cannot directly dismiss them, but at least a few recent PMs are known to have given an undated letter of resignation for themselves to the president upon taking office, and the president generally has some influence over the PM. The president also names and dismisses the other ministers, with the advice of the prime minister.
- The president names most officials (with the assent of the cabinet).
- The president names certain members of the Constitutional Council (former presidents are also members of this council).
- The president receives foreign ambassadors.
- The president may grant a pardon (but not an amnesty) to convicted criminals; the president can also lessen or suppress criminal sentences. This was of crucial importance when France still operated the death penalty: criminals sentenced to death would generally request that the president commute their sentence to life imprisonment.

All decisions of the president must be countersigned by the prime minister, except dissolving the National Assembly, choice of prime minister, and other dispositions referred to in Article 19.

=== Detailed constitutional powers ===
The constitutional attributions of the president are defined in Title II of the Constitution of France.

Article 5: The president of the republic shall see that the Constitution is observed. He shall ensure, by his arbitration, the proper functioning of the public authorities and the continuity of the State. He shall be the guarantor of national independence, territorial integrity and observance of treaties.

Article 8: The president of the republic shall appoint the prime minister. He shall terminate the appointment of the prime minister when the latter tenders the resignation of the Government. On the proposal of the prime minister, he shall appoint the other members of the Government and terminate their appointments.

Article 9: The president of the republic shall preside over the Council of Ministers.

Article 10: The president of the republic shall promulgate acts of parliament within fifteen days following the final adoption of an act and its transmission to the Government. He may, before the expiry of this time limit, ask Parliament to reconsider the act or sections of the Act. Reconsideration shall not be refused. While the President has to sign all acts adopted by parliament into law, he cannot refuse to do so and exercise a kind of right of veto; his only power in that matter is to ask for a single reconsideration of the law by parliament and this power is subject to countersigning by the Prime minister.

Article 11: The president could submit laws to the people in a referendum with advice and consent of the cabinet.

Article 12: The president of the republic may, after consulting the prime minister and the presidents of the assemblies, declare the National Assembly dissolved. A general election shall take place not less than twenty days and not more than forty days after the dissolution. The National Assembly shall convene as of right on the second Thursday following its election. Should it so convene outside the period prescribed for the ordinary session, a session shall be called by right for a fifteen-day period. No further dissolution shall take place within a year following this election.

Article 13: The president of the republic shall sign the ordinances and decrees deliberated upon in the Council of Ministers. He shall make appointments to the civil and military posts of the State. [...]

Article 14: The president of the republic shall accredit ambassadors and envoys extraordinary to foreign powers; foreign ambassadors and envoys extraordinary shall be accredited to him.

Article 15: The president of the republic shall be commander-in-chief of the armed forces. He shall preside over the higher national defence councils and committees.

Article 16: Where the institutions of the republic, the independence of the nation, the integrity of its territory or the fulfilment of its international commitments are under serious and immediate threat, and where the proper functioning of the constitutional public authorities is interrupted, the president of the republic shall take the measures required by these circumstances, after formally consulting the prime minister, the presidents of the assemblies and the Constitutional Council. He shall inform the nation of these measures in a message. The measures must stem from the desire to provide the constitutional public authorities, in the shortest possible time, with the means to carry out their duties. The Constitutional Council shall be consulted with regard to such measures. Parliament shall convene as of right. The National Assembly shall not be dissolved during the exercise of the emergency powers.

Article 16, allowing the president a limited form of rule by decree for a limited period of time in exceptional circumstance, has been used only once, by Charles de Gaulle during the Algerian War, from 23 April to 29 September 1961.

Article 17: The president of the republic has the right to grant pardon.

Article 18: The president of the republic shall communicate with the two assemblies of Parliament by means of messages, which he shall cause to be read and which shall not be the occasion for any debate. He can also give an address in front of the Congress of France in Versailles. Outside sessions, Parliament shall be convened especially for this purpose.

Article 19: Acts of the president of the republic, other than those provided for under articles 8 (first paragraph), 11, 12, 16, 18, 54, 56 and 61, shall be countersigned by the prime minister and, where required, by the appropriate ministers.

=== Presidential amnesties ===
Before the 2008 constitutional reform forbidding them, there was a tradition of so-called "presidential amnesties", which are something of a misnomer: after the election of a president, and of a National Assembly of the same party, parliament would traditionally vote a law granting amnesty for some petty crimes (it was also a way of reducing jail overpopulation). This practice had been increasingly criticized, particularly because it was believed to inspire people to commit traffic offences in the months preceding the election. Such an amnesty law would also authorize the president to designate individuals who have committed certain categories of crimes to be offered amnesty, if certain conditions are met. Such individual measures have been criticized for the political patronage that they allow. The difference between an amnesty and a presidential pardon is that the former clears all subsequent effects of the sentencing, as though the crime had not been committed, while pardon simply relieves the sentenced individual from part or all of the remainder of the sentence.

== Criminal responsibility and impeachment ==
Articles 67 and 68 organize the regime of criminal responsibility of the president. They were reformed by a 2007 constitutional act in order to clarify a situation that previously resulted in legal controversies. The president of the Republic enjoys immunity during their term: they cannot be requested to testify before any jurisdiction, they cannot be prosecuted, etc. However, the statute of limitations is suspended during their term, and enquiries and prosecutions can be restarted, at the latest one month after they leave office. The president is not deemed personally responsible for their actions in their official capacity, except where their actions are indicted before the International Criminal Court (France is a member of the ICC and the president is a French citizen as another following the Court's rules) or where impeachment is moved against them. Impeachment can be pronounced by the Republican High Court, a special court convened from both houses of Parliament on the proposal of either House, should the president have failed to discharge their duties in a way that evidently precludes the continuation of their term.

== Succession and incapacity ==
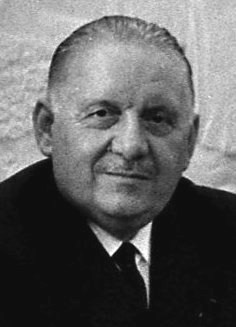
Alain Poher, acting president of France in 1969 and 1974

Upon the death in office, removal, or resignation of the president, the Senate's president takes over as acting president. Alain Poher is the only person to have served in this temporary position, and has done so twice: the first time in 1969 after Charles de Gaulle's resignation and a second time in 1974 after Georges Pompidou's death while in office. In this situation, the president of the Senate does not have to resign from their position while acting as president.

The first round of a new presidential election must be organized no sooner than twenty days and no later than thirty-five days following the vacancy of the presidency. Fifteen days can separate the first and second rounds of a presidential election; this means that the president of the Senate can only act as President of the Republic for a maximum period of fifty days.

During this interim period, acting presidents are not allowed to dismiss the national assembly, nor are they allowed to call for a referendum or initiate any constitutional changes. If there is no president of the Senate, the powers of the president of the republic are exercised by the Gouvernement, meaning the Cabinet. This has been interpreted by some constitutional academics as meaning first the prime minister and, if they are themselves not able to act, the members of the cabinet in the order of the list of the decree that nominated them. This is in fact unlikely to happen, because if the president of the Senate is not able to act, the Senate will normally name a new president of the Senate, who will act as President of the Republic.

During the Third French Republic the president of the Council of Ministers acted as president whenever the office was vacant. According to article 7 of the Constitution, if the presidency becomes vacant for any reason, or if the president becomes incapacitated, upon the request of the Gouvernement, the Constitutional Council may rule, by a majority vote, that the presidency is to be temporarily assumed by the president of the Senate. If the Council rules that the incapacity is permanent, the same procedure as for the resignation is applied, as described above. If the president cannot attend meetings, including meetings of the Council of Ministers, they can ask the prime minister to attend in their stead (Constitution, article 21). This clause has been applied by presidents travelling abroad, ill, or undergoing surgery. During the Second French Republic, there was a vice president. The only person to ever hold the position was Henri Georges Boulay de la Meurthe.

== Death in office ==
Four French presidents have died in office:

- Sadi Carnot, who was assassinated by Sante Geronimo Caserio on 25 June 1894, aged 56.
- Félix Faure, who died of a stroke on 16 February 1899, aged 58.
- Paul Doumer, who was assassinated by Paul Gorguloff on 7 May 1932, aged 75, the oldest to die in office.
- Georges Pompidou, who died of cancer on 2 April 1974, aged 62.

== Pay and official residences ==
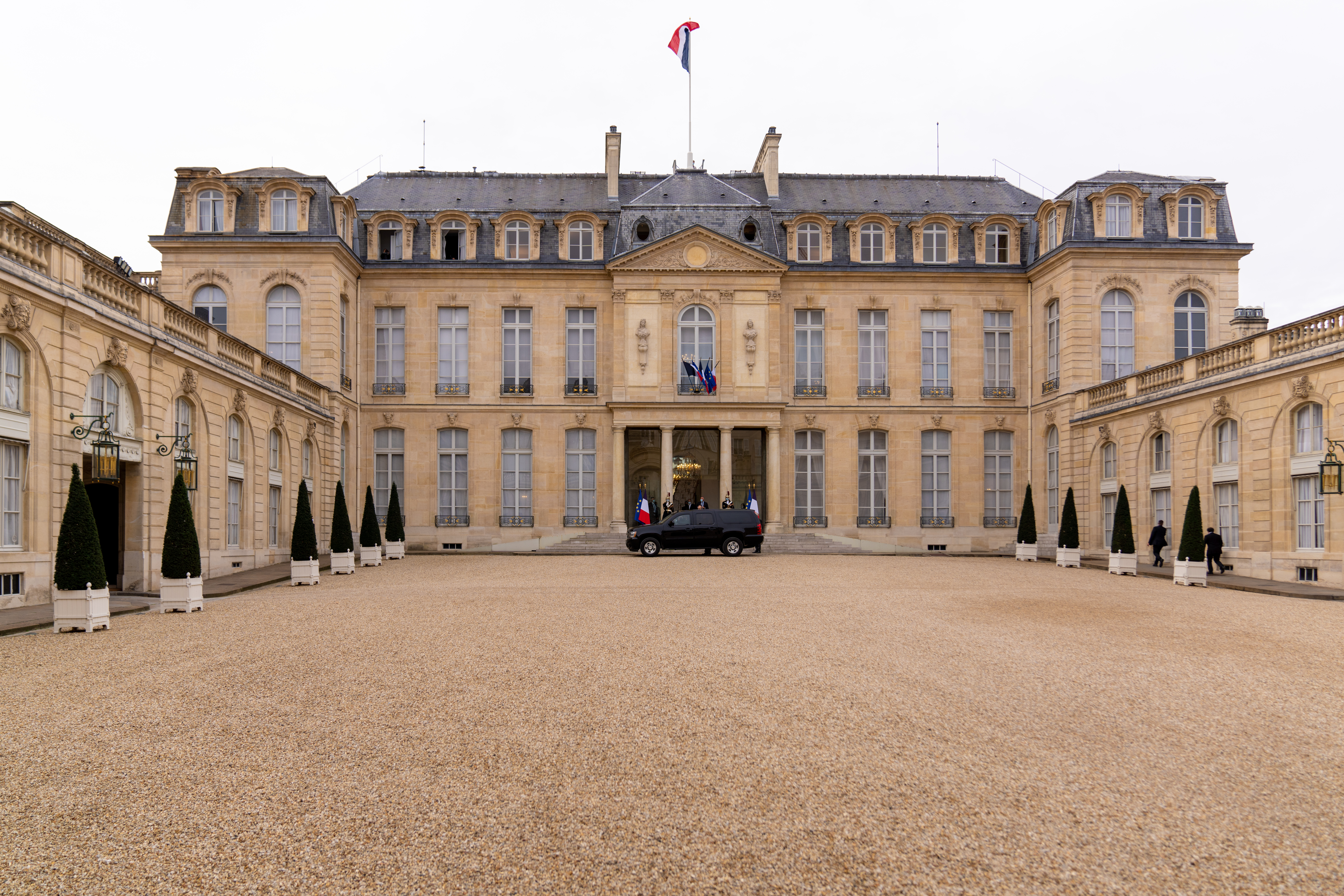
The Élysée Palace, the principal residence of the president

The president of the Republic is paid a salary according to a pay grade defined in comparison to the pay grades of the most senior members of the French Civil Service ("out of scale", hors échelle, those whose pay grades are known as letters and not as numeric indices). In addition they are paid a residence stipend of 3%, and a function stipend of 25% on top of the salary and residence indemnity. This gross salary and these indemnities are the same as those of the prime minister, and are 50% higher than the highest paid to other members of the government, which is itself defined as twice the average of the highest (pay grade G) and the lowest (pay grade A1) salaries in the "out of scale" pay grades. Using the 2008 "out of scale" pay grades, it amounts to a monthly pay of 20,963 euros, which fits the 19,000 euros quoted to the press in early 2008. Using the pay grades starting from 1 July 2009, this amounts to a gross monthly pay of €21,131. The salary and the residence stipend are taxable for income tax. The official residence and office of the president is the Élysée Palace in Paris. Other presidential residences include:

- the Hôtel de Marigny, standing next to the Élysée Palace, houses foreign official guests;
- the Château de Rambouillet is normally open to visitors when not used for (rare) official meetings;
- the Domaine national de Marly is normally open to visitors when not used for (rare) official meetings;
- the Fort de Brégançon, in Southeastern France, is the official presidential vacation residence. In 2013, it became a national monument and is opened to the public some moments since 2014. The French president's private quarters there are still available for their use;
- La Lanterne became an official presidential vacation residence in 2007.

== Pension and benefits ==
According to French law, former presidents of the Republic have guaranteed lifetime pension defined according to the pay grade of the Councillors of State, a courtesy diplomatic passport, and, according to the French Constitution (Article 56), membership of the Constitutional Council. They also get personnel, an apartment or office, and other amenities though the legal basis for these is disputed. The current system for providing personnel and other amenities to the former French presidents was devised in 1981 by Michel Charasse, then advisor to President François Mitterrand, in order to care for former president Valéry Giscard d'Estaing and the widow of former President Georges Pompidou. In 2008, according to an answer by the services of the prime minister to a question from René Dosière, a member of the National Assembly, the facilities comprised: a security detail, a car with a chauffeur, first class train tickets and an office or housing space, as well as two people who service the space. In addition, funds are available for seven permanent assistants. President Hollande announced a reform of the system in 2016. Former presidents of France will no longer receive a car with chauffeur and the personnel in their living space was cut as well. Additionally, the number of assistants available for their use has been reduced, but a state flat or house remains available for former officeholders. Train tickets are also available if the trip is justified by the office of the former officeholder as part of official business. The security personnel around former presidents of France remained unchanged.

== Lists relating to the presidents of France ==
- List of presidents of France
- List of presidents of France by tenure
- List of heads of state of France
- French presidential inauguration
- List of French non-presidential heads of state by tenure

== See also ==
- French presidential elections under the Fifth Republic
- Politics of France
