= Mrs. C. Morse Ely House =

Historic house in Illinois, United States

- U.S. National Register of Historic Places
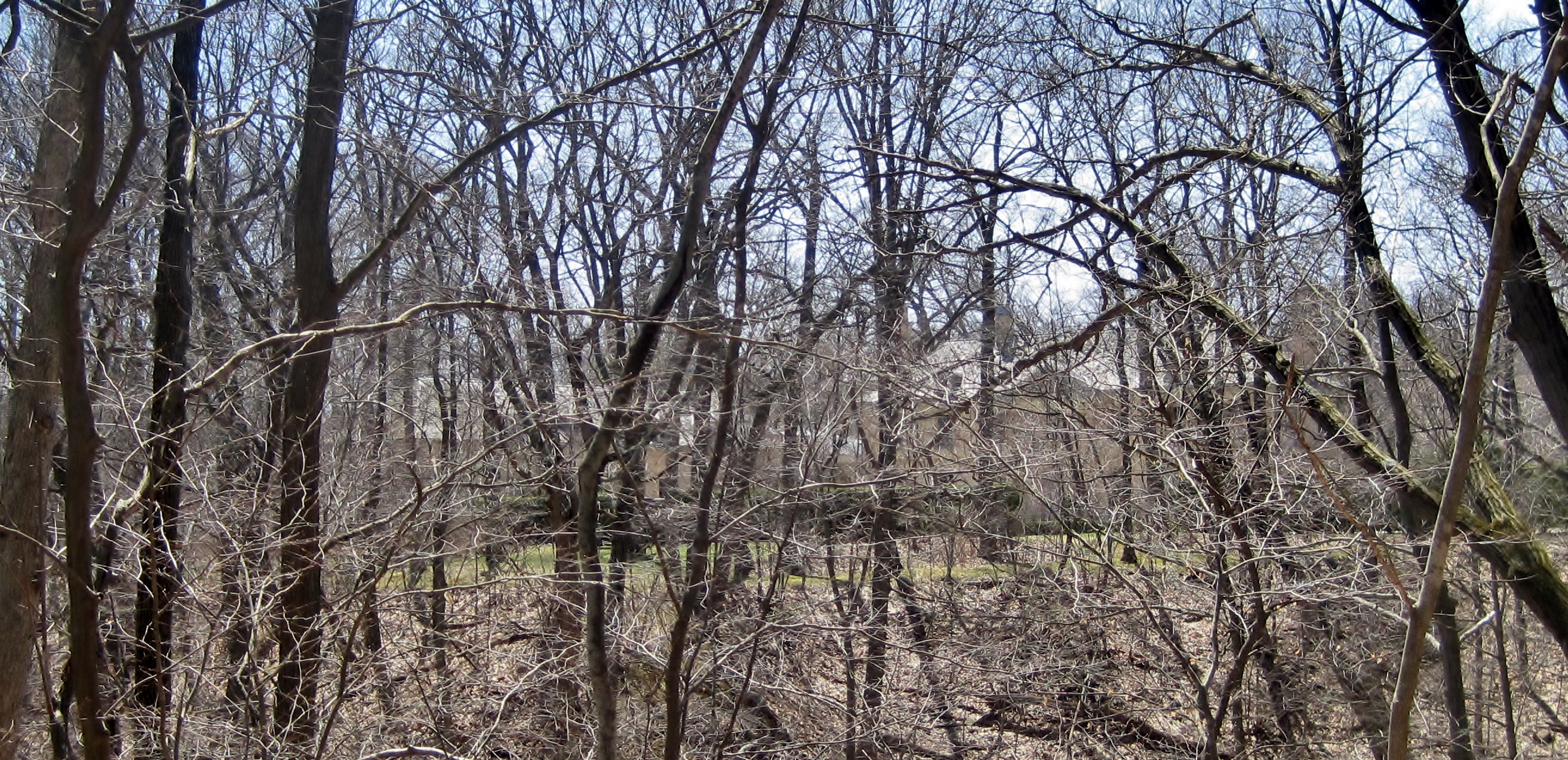

- Location within Chicago metropolitan area Location within Illinois Location within the United States
- Location: 111 Moffett Rd., Lake Bluff, Illinois
- Coordinates: 42°16′18″N 87°49′57″W
- Area: 5.9 acres (2.4 ha)
- Built: 1923
- Architect: David Adler
- Architectural style: French Renaissance Revival
- NRHP reference No.: 00001339
- Added to NRHP: November 8, 2000

The Mrs. C. Morse Ely House is a historic house at 111 Moffett Road in Lake Bluff, Illinois. The house was built in 1923 for Mrs. C. Morse Ely, one of several wealthy Chicagoans who built homes in Lake Bluff in the early twentieth century. Architect David Adler gave the house a French Renaissance Revival design inspired by the French château La Lanterne. Adler was well known for his eclectic designs, and French architecture heavily influenced his work. The house's design includes a symmetrical plan, quoins and other ornamental brickwork, limestone pilasters and pediments, casement windows, and five chimneys.

The house was added to the National Register of Historic Places on November 8, 2000.
