= List of French non-presidential heads of state by tenure =

This is a list of the Republican French heads of state who have not held the title "President of the Republic" since the final fall of House of Capet in 1848, as sorted by length of service.

== List ==
Portrait	Name (Birth–Death)	Title	Term of office		Political Party (Political Coalition)
	Philippe Pétain (1856–1951)	Chief of State	11 July 1940	19 August 1944	Independent
	Charles de Gaulle (1890–1970)	Chairman of the Provisional Government	20 August 1944	26 January 1946	Independent
	Louis-Eugène Cavaignac (1802–1857)	Chief of the Executive Power	28 June 1848	20 December 1848	Republican
	Jacques-Charles Dupont de l'Eure (1767–1855)	Chairman of the Provisional Government	26 February 1848	9 May 1848	Moderate Republican
	Félix Gouin (1884–1977)	Chairman of the Provisional Government	26 January 1946	24 June 1946	French Section of the Workers' International (Tripartisme)
	Georges Bidault (1899–1983)	Chairman of the Provisional Government	24 June 1946	28 November 1946	Popular Republican Movement (Tripartisme)
	Louis-Jules Trochu (1815–1896)	President of the Government of National Defense	4 September 1870	22 January 1871	Military
	Léon Blum (1872–1950)	Chairman of the Provisional Government	16 December 1946	22 January 1947	French Section of the Workers' International (Tripartisme)
	François Arago (1786–1853)	Chairman of the Executive Commission	10 May 1848	24 June 1848	Moderate Republican
	Vincent Auriol (1884–1966) (interim)	President of the French Fourth Republic	28 November 1946	16 December 1946	French Section of the Workers' International (Tripartisme)
