= Green Bay Road Historic District (Lake Forest, Illinois) =

Historic district in Illinois, United States

- U.S. National Register of Historic Places
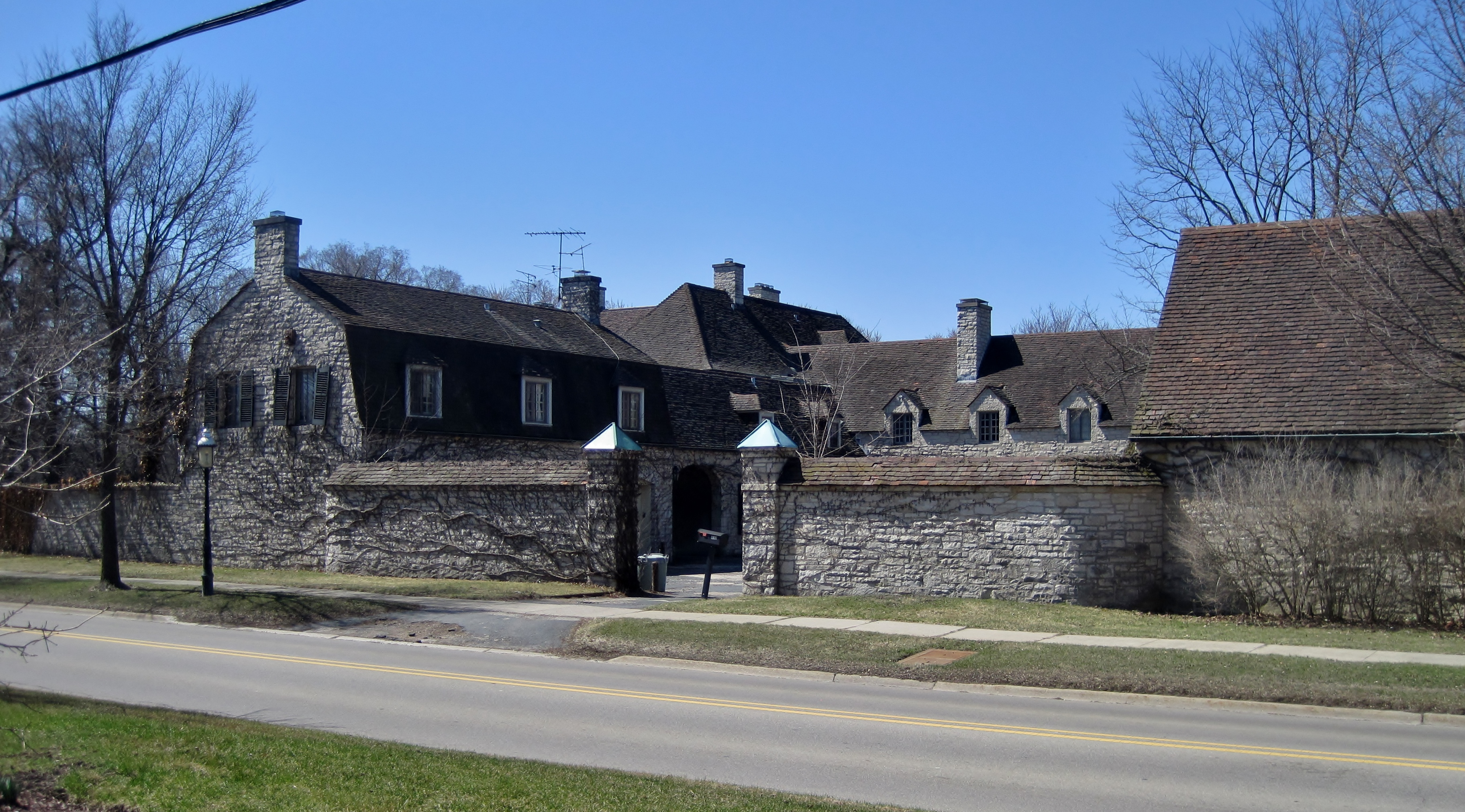
- Innisfail

- Location within Chicago metropolitan area Location within Illinois Location within the United States
- Location: Roughly, area surrounding 10 S to 1596 N Green Bay Rd. and Ahwahnee Rd., Lake Forest, Illinois
- Coordinates: 42°15′43″N 87°50′52″W
- Area: 680 acres (280 ha)
- NRHP reference No.: 95001235
- Added to NRHP: November 7, 1995

The Green Bay Road Historic District is a residential historic district in Lake Forest, Illinois. Centered on Green Bay Road, a historic postal and military road that once connected Chicago with Green Bay, Wisconsin, the district includes 147 contributing buildings. The houses in the district are mainly country estates built in the late nineteenth and early twentieth century for some of the Chicago area's wealthiest residents. The Onwentsia Club, a country club to which most of the district's residents belonged, was the center of the area's social life and is also part of the district. The district includes works by several prominent Chicago architects, including Howard Van Doren Shaw, David Adler, Ambrose Coghill Cramer, and Chester Howe Walcott. While the Arts and Crafts style preferred by Shaw is common in the district, most of the other houses are designed in revival styles, including Classical Revival, Renaissance Revival, Colonial Revival, and Tudor Revival.

The district was added to the National Register of Historic Places on November 7, 1995.
