= David Adler (architect) =

American architect (1882–1949)

- Born: January 3, 1882; Milwaukee, Wisconsin, US
- Died: September 27, 1949 (aged 67); Libertyville, Illinois, US
- Occupation: Architect
- Practice: Adler & Dangler, Adler & Work
- Buildings: Castle Hill

David Adler FAIA (January 3, 1882 – September 27, 1949) was an American architect who mostly practiced around Chicago, Illinois. He was prolific throughout his career, designing over 200 buildings in over thirty-five years. He was also a long-time board member of the Art Institute of Chicago.

== Biography ==
=== Early life ===
Adler was born on January 3, 1882, in Milwaukee, Wisconsin to a German Jewish family, the son of Isaac David Adler, a prosperous wholesale manufacturer of men's clothing, and Therese Hyman Adler. One of David Adler's sisters, Frances, became a prominent interior designer. (He also had an older brother, Murray, who died in 1883 of diphtheria.) Adler attended Milwaukee public schools until age 16, when he left Wisconsin to enroll in the Lawrenceville School in New Jersey. Adler enrolled at Princeton University in 1900, studying art, architectural history and Greek. At Princeton, Adler designed a remodel for the Charter Club, an upperclassmen's eating club.

The origins of Adler’s interest in architecture are unclear. He began illustrating while attending Lawrenceville, contributing artwork to school publications. Although he struggled academically at Princeton, he demonstrated a strong aptitude for architecture during his architectural studies. After graduating in 1904, he traveled extensively, mostly to study the architecture of Europe. He studied for three semesters at the Technical University of Munich in Germany. From 1906 to 1911, Adler studied at the École des Beaux-Arts. An avid cyclist, Adler would travel to the countryside of France, Italy, and England to visit country houses and collect picture postcards.

=== Career ===
After returning to the United States in 1911, he began working as an architect for Howard Van Doren Shaw in Chicago, Illinois. Shaw was considered the foremost architect of country houses in the Chicago area. After six months of study, he opened a new office with a friend from Paris, Henry Dangler, in Orchestra Hall. Together, the pair secured commissions for country estates for William E. Clow Jr., Ralph Poole, Benjamin Nields, Morris E. Berney, David B. Jones, and Charles B. Pike. However, Adler had never received an architectural license, failing the exam in 1917. Because of this, Dangler had to sign off on Adler's drawings because they legally had to be signed by a registered architect.

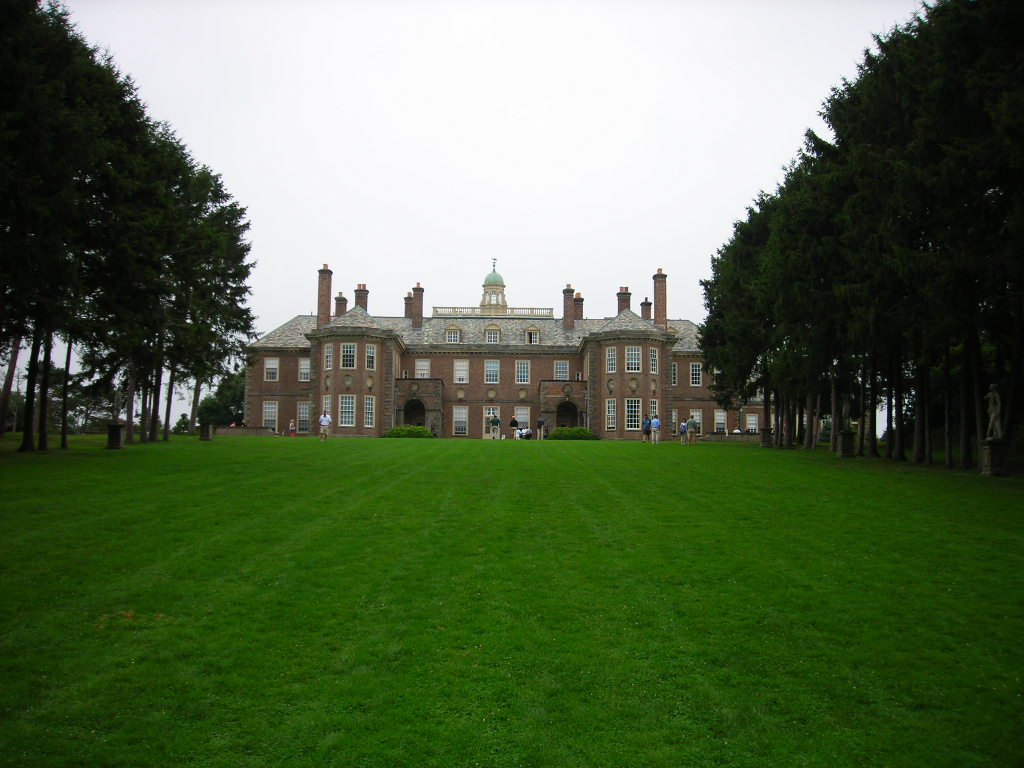
In 1926, Adler designed Castle Hill, which is now recognized as a National Historic Landmark.

After Dangler died in 1917, Adler needed to partner with another architect with a structural background who could sign off on his projects. He began working with Robert Work. In 1918, Adler purchased an 1864 farmhouse in Libertyville, Illinois for his estate, and extensively remodeled it. Aspiring architect Paul Schweikher, who would go on to have a significant residential practice of his own, studied under Adler for a year starting in 1923. In 1928, with thirty commissions to his name and support from fellow architects, the state examining board presented Adler with an honorary license.

From this point forward, Adler operated his practice alone. The Roaring Twenties was Adler's most prosperous time, but he struggled during the subsequent Great Depression. An injury in 1935 during a fox hunt further slowed Adler. Also that year, Adler met with Jerrod Loebl and John A. Holabird, who were commissioned by the Armour Institute of Technology to find a new head of architecture for the school. Adler recommended Ludwig Mies van der Rohe, who was eventually selected for the job. Over his career, Adler designed 45 country houses, 27 in the Chicago area.

A number of Adler's works are listed on the National Register of Historic Places:

=== Personal life ===
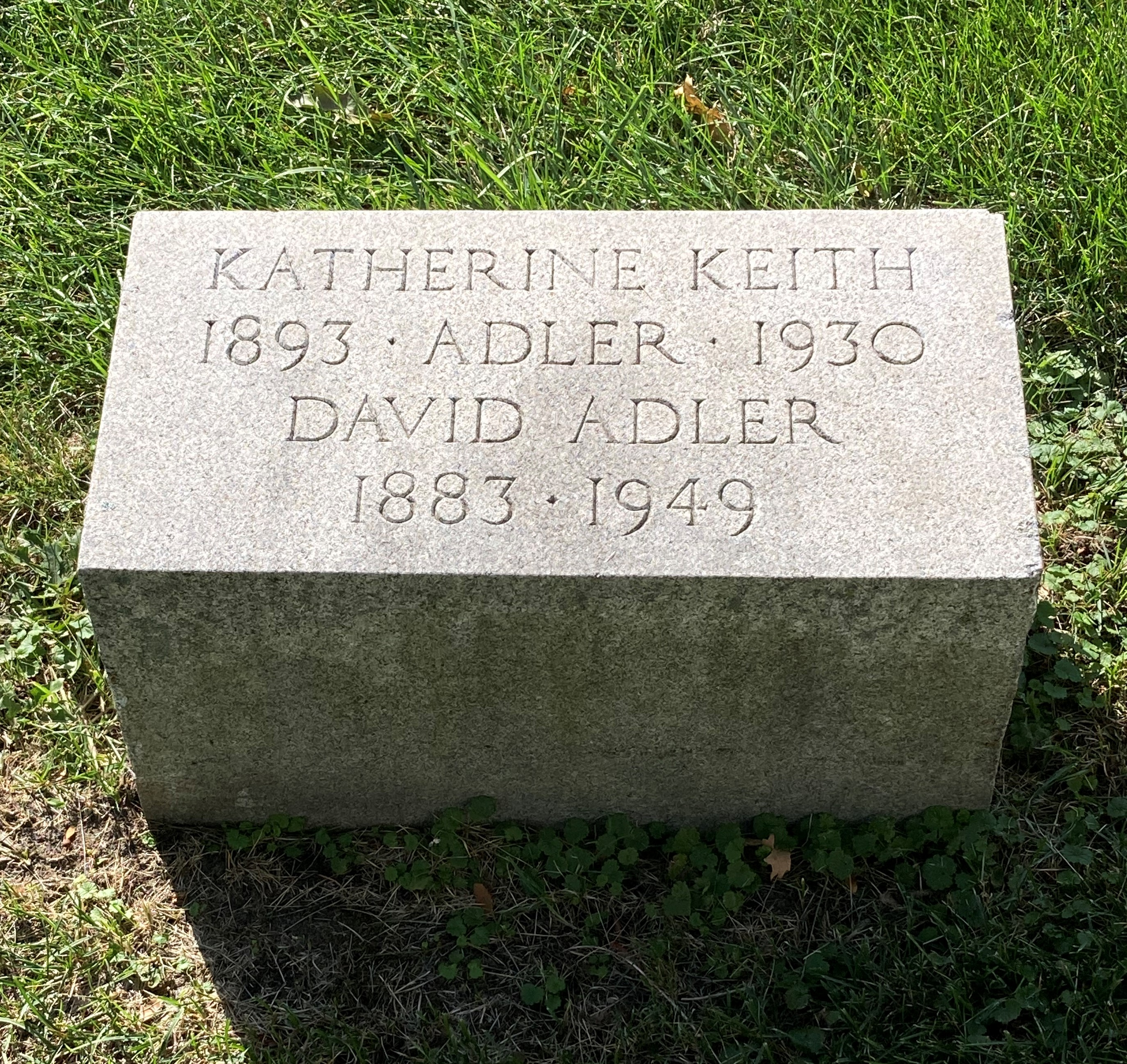
Graves of Katherine Keith and David Adler at Graceland Cemetery

Adler married Katherine Keith, an Illinois socialite and writer, in 1916. In 1925, he was named a trustee of the Art Institute of Chicago, a position that he held for the rest of his life. He became a widower in 1930 after his wife was killed in a car accident in Europe. Adler was named a Fellow of the American Institute of Architects in 1941 and a member of the National Institute of Arts and Letters in 1945. Adler died of a heart attack in his sleep, aged 67, in Libertyville. He is buried in Graceland Cemetery in Chicago.

Adler's religious beliefs are uncertain, although he certainly attempted to appear Protestant. His parents were German Jews. However, at the Technical University of Munich, Adler identified his beliefs as Episcopalian; this may have been due to the discrimination facing Jews at the time. Adler married Katherine Keith in a Universalist church. Adler's father was cremated—a funeral rite that was not sanctioned by the Jewish religion—and interred at a non-denominational cemetery owned by the Episcopal Church. His mother was also buried in a non-denominational cemetery, indicating that his parents may have similarly downplayed their Jewish faith or converted entirely. Adler's clientele were mostly Presbyterian and probably would have not knowingly commissioned a non-WASP to design their houses.

== Work ==
Adler's works include:

- Dewey House (1913), Veterans Administration Medical Center North Chicago, IL, NRHP-listed
- David Adler Estate (1916-18 remodel), 1700 N Milwaukee Ave. Libertyville, IL, NRHP-listed
- Villa Terrace Decorative Arts Museum (1924) Milwaukee, WI, NRHP-listed
- Castle Hill (1928), E of Ipswich on Argilla Rd. Ipswich, MA, NRHP-listed
- Lester Armour House (1931), Lake Bluff, IL, NRHP-listed. One of Adler's "purest" houses.
- Mrs. Isaac D. Adler House (1931 remodel), 1480 N. Milwaukee Ave. Libertyville, IL, NRHP-listed
- Waverly (1940 remodel), S of Middleburg on VA 626 Middleburg, VA, NRHP-listed
- William McCormick Blair Estate, 982 Sheridan Rd. Lake Bluff, IL, NRHP-listed
- Mrs. C. Morse Ely House, 111 Moffett Rd. Lake Bluff, IL, NRHP-listed
- Field Estate, Field Rd. and Camino Real Sarasota, FL, NRHP-listed
- One or more works in Green Bay Road Historic District, Roughly, area surrounding 10 S to 1596 N Green Bay Rd. and Ahwahnee Rd. Lake Forest, IL, NRHP-listed
- Mrs. Kersey Coates Reed House, 1315 N. Lake Rd. Lake Forest, IL, NRHP-listed
- William E. Clow, Jr. House, in Vine–Oakwood–Green Bay Road Historic District, Lake Forest, IL, NRHP-listed
- The Nields House, 145 Milton Road, Rye, New York
