= Field Estate =

Historic house in Florida, United States

- U.S. National Register of Historic Places
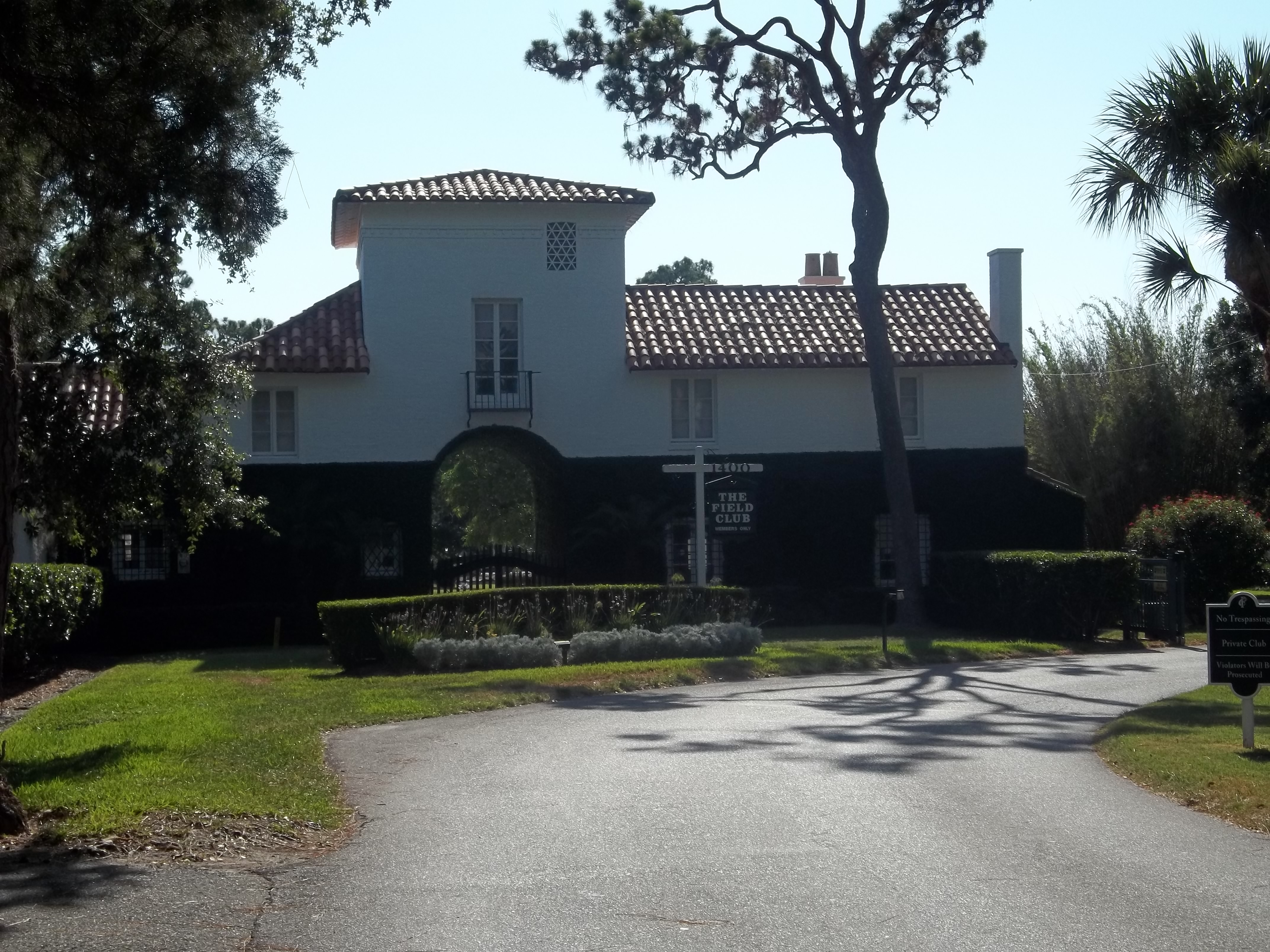

- Location within Florida Location within the United States
- Location: Sarasota, Florida
- Coordinates: 27°17′11″N 82°32′20″W
- NRHP reference No.: 86001238
- Added to NRHP: June 5, 1986

The Field Estate (also known as the Wealake or Field Club of Sarasota) is a historic site in Sarasota, Florida, United States. It is located at Field Road and Camino Real. On June 5, 1986, it was added to the U.S. National Register of Historic Places.

== References and external links ==
- Sarasota County listings at National Register of Historic Places
- Sarasota County listings at Florida's Office of Cultural and Historical Programs
