= Vine–Oakwood–Green Bay Road Historic District =

Historic district in Illinois, United States

- U.S. National Register of Historic Places
- U.S. Historic district
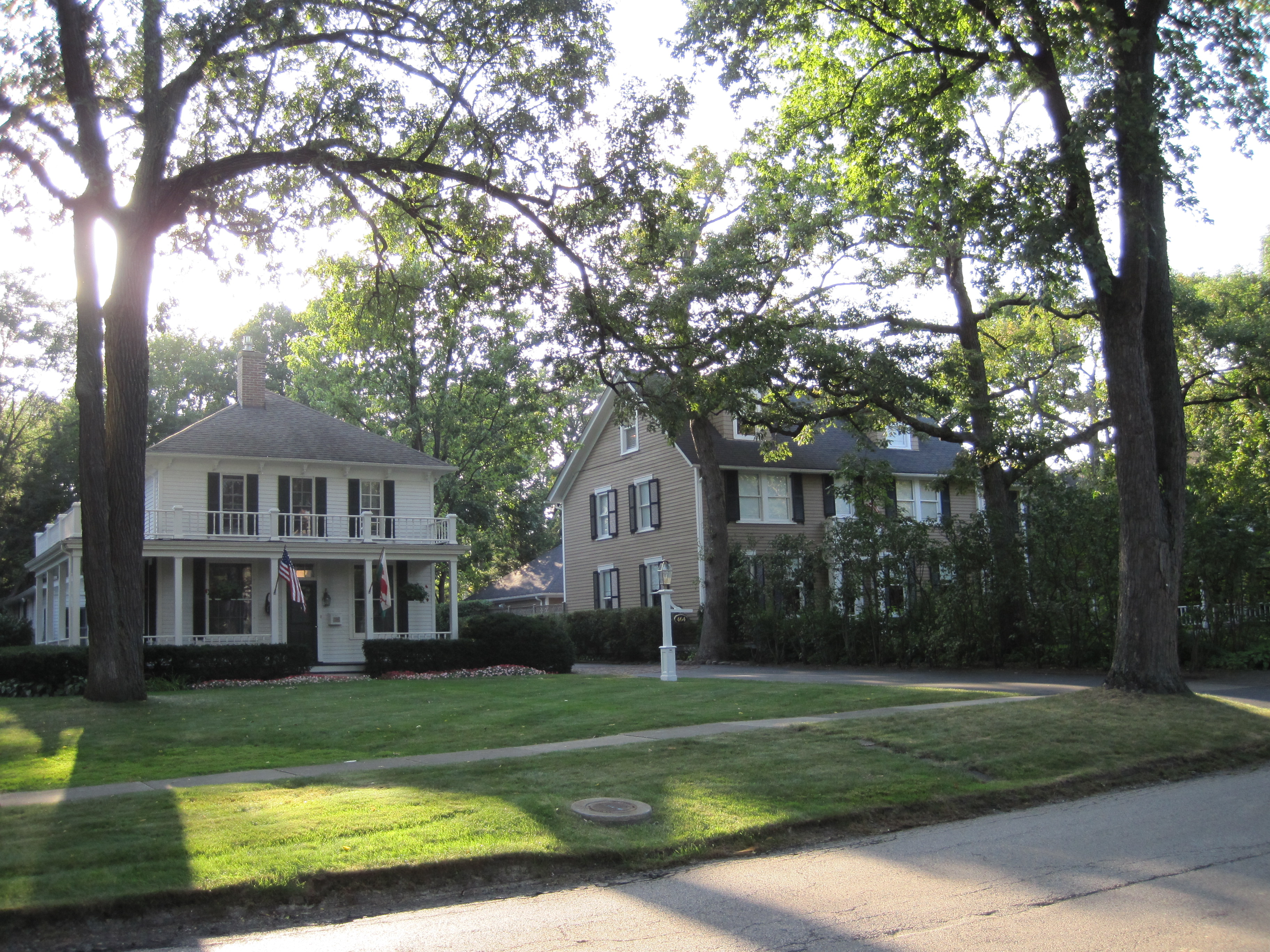
- Two houses (464 and 486 Oakwood Ave.) in the Vine–Oakwood–Green Bay Road Historic District.

- Location within Illinois Location within the United States
- Location: Green Bay Rd., E. Vine and N. Oakwood Aves., Lake Forest, Illinois
- Coordinates: 42°14′52″N 87°50′29″W
- Area: 13 acres (5.3 ha)
- Built: 1859
- Architect: Multiple
- Architectural style: Late 19th And 20th Century Revivals, Late Victorian
- NRHP reference No.: 80001381
- Added to NRHP: March 28, 1980

The Vine–Oakwood–Green Bay Road Historic District is a residential historic district in Lake Forest, Illinois. The district contains twenty houses on Oakwood Ave., Vine Ave., and Green Bay Road.

== History ==
Patrick Conlin built a house on a well-drained region of what would become Lake Forest, Illinois in 1856. The next year, the eastern portion of the town was platted by Jed Hotchkiss. The Vine–Oakwood–Green Bay Road community was first planned at this point as part of a simple grid system west of the Chicago and North Western Railways tracks. Eastern Lake Forest gradually became known as a retreat for the wealthy citizens of Chicago, who built estates on the curving, tree-lined streets. The Vine–Oakwood–Green Bay Road region, however, was reserved for individuals of more moderate socio-economic statues until at least the 1890s. A business district developed in the 1910s and the Vine–Oakwood–Green Bay Road neighborhood became ideally located.

Houses are generally of modest size and are dominated by historical revival styles. An Italianate house at 481 Oakwood Avenue is among the oldest remaining houses in Lake Forest. It was built in the 1860s for Joseph Barnett. Kate McLaughlin, who would be named Lake Forest postmistress in 1887, built a house in 1883. It was later enlarged in 1919. Her successor, High Smith, built a house in 1891. Early settler John J. McIntyre built a house in 1884 after selling his farm and retiring. John Dean is thought to have built three houses in the district in the mid-1890s. Wallis Simpson, the future Duchess of Windsor, rented a house for about a year at 494 Oakwood Avenue. Lars Nielson built a duplex at 469-471 Oakwood Avenue in 1910 and lived in one of the units. The most architecturally notable house in the district is the William E. Clow, Jr. House at 461 North Green Bay Road, designed by David Adler in 1913.

The neighborhood was listed by the National Park Service on the National Register of Historic Places on March 28, 1980, amid concerns that the commercial district would expand south through the neighborhood.

== Gallery ==
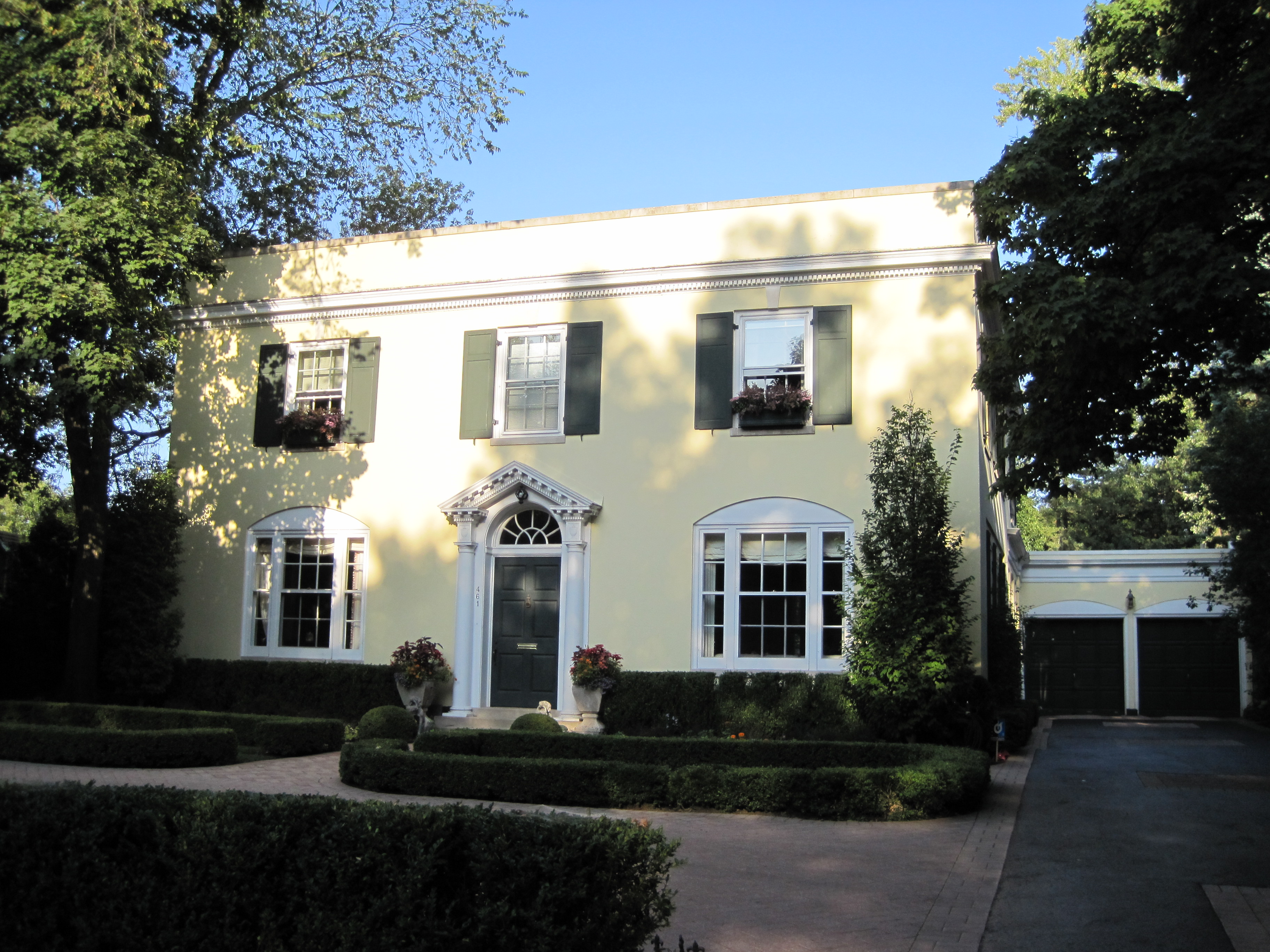
461 Green Bay Road

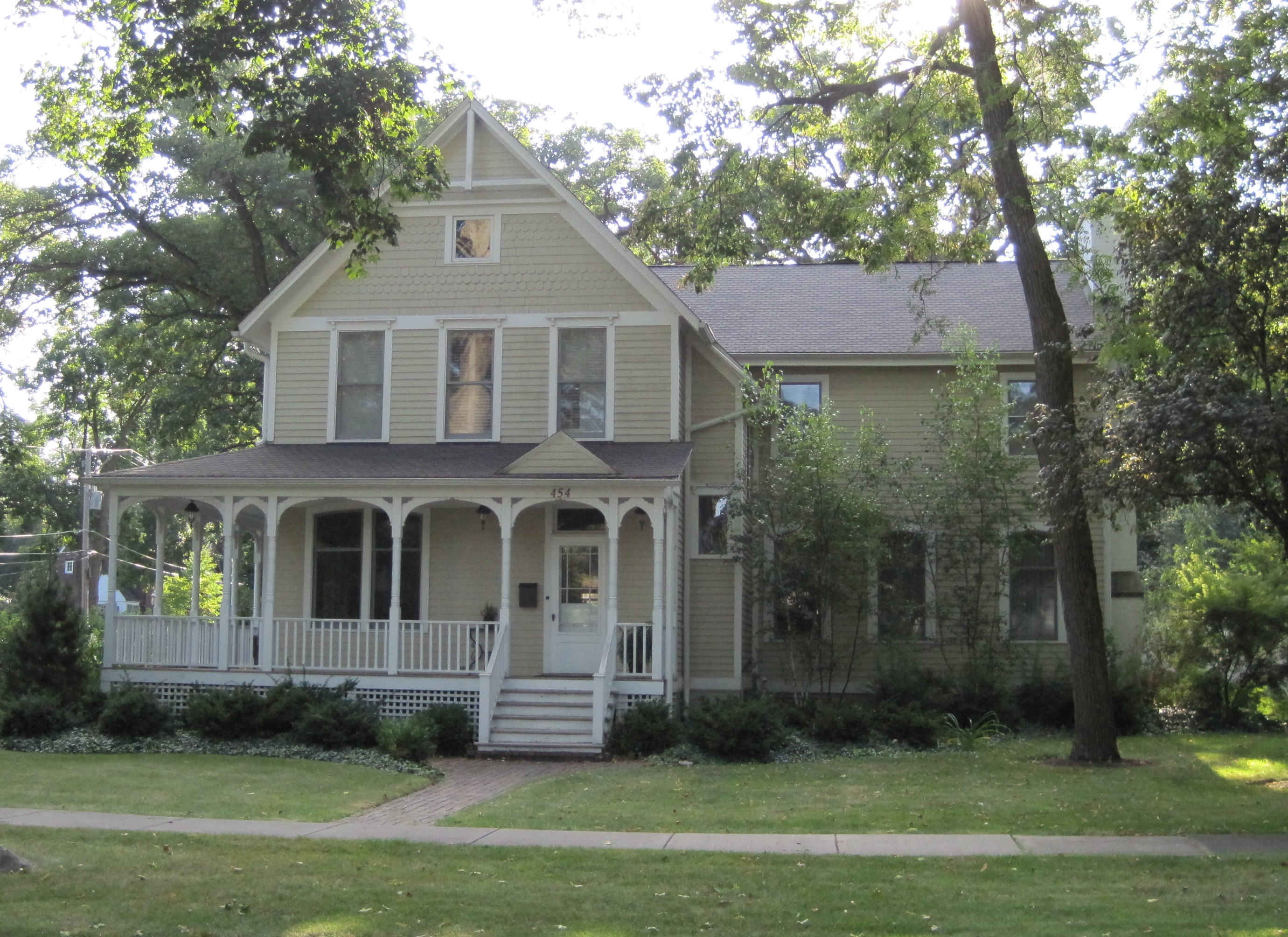
454 Oakwood Avenue

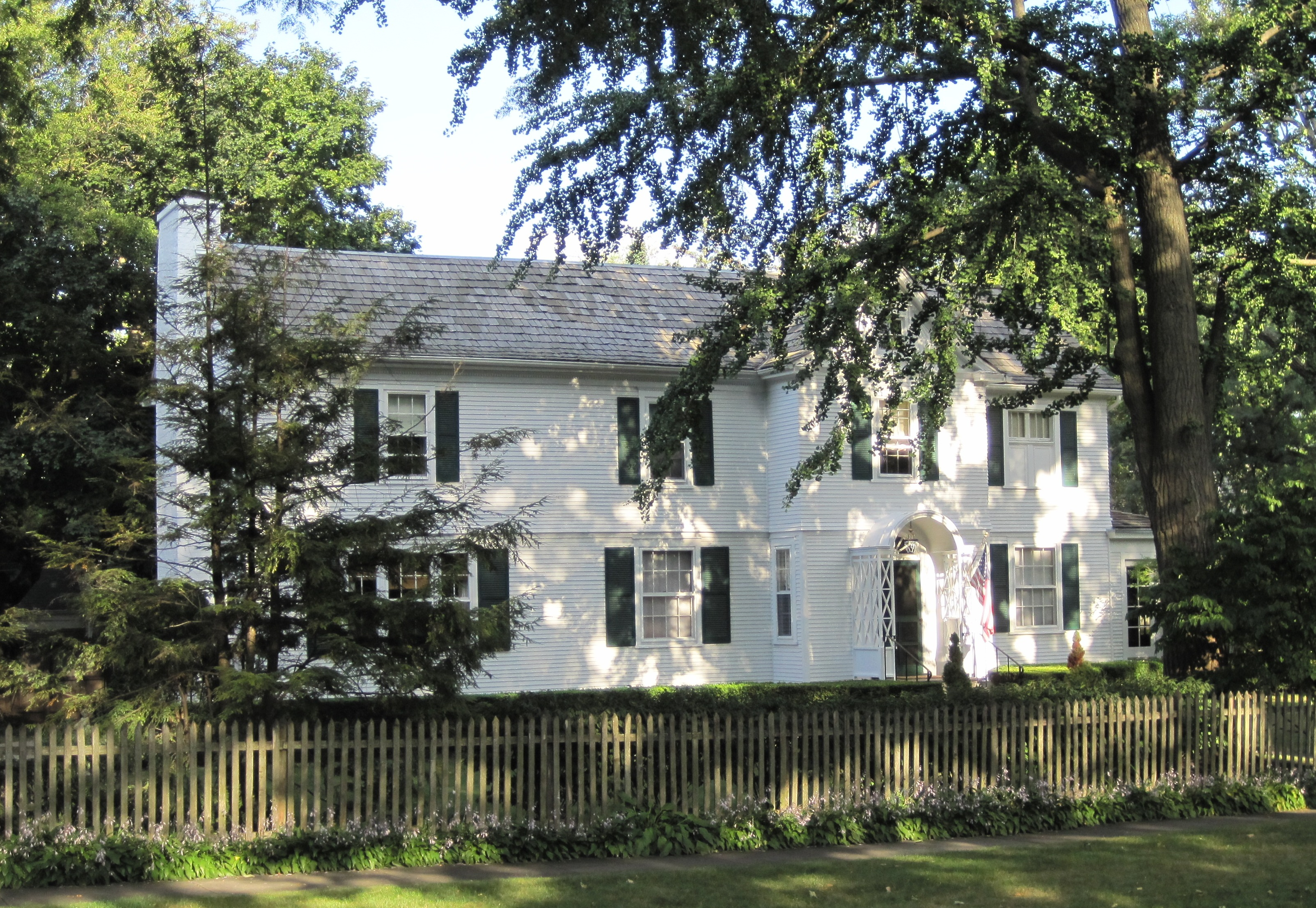
455 Oakwood Avenue

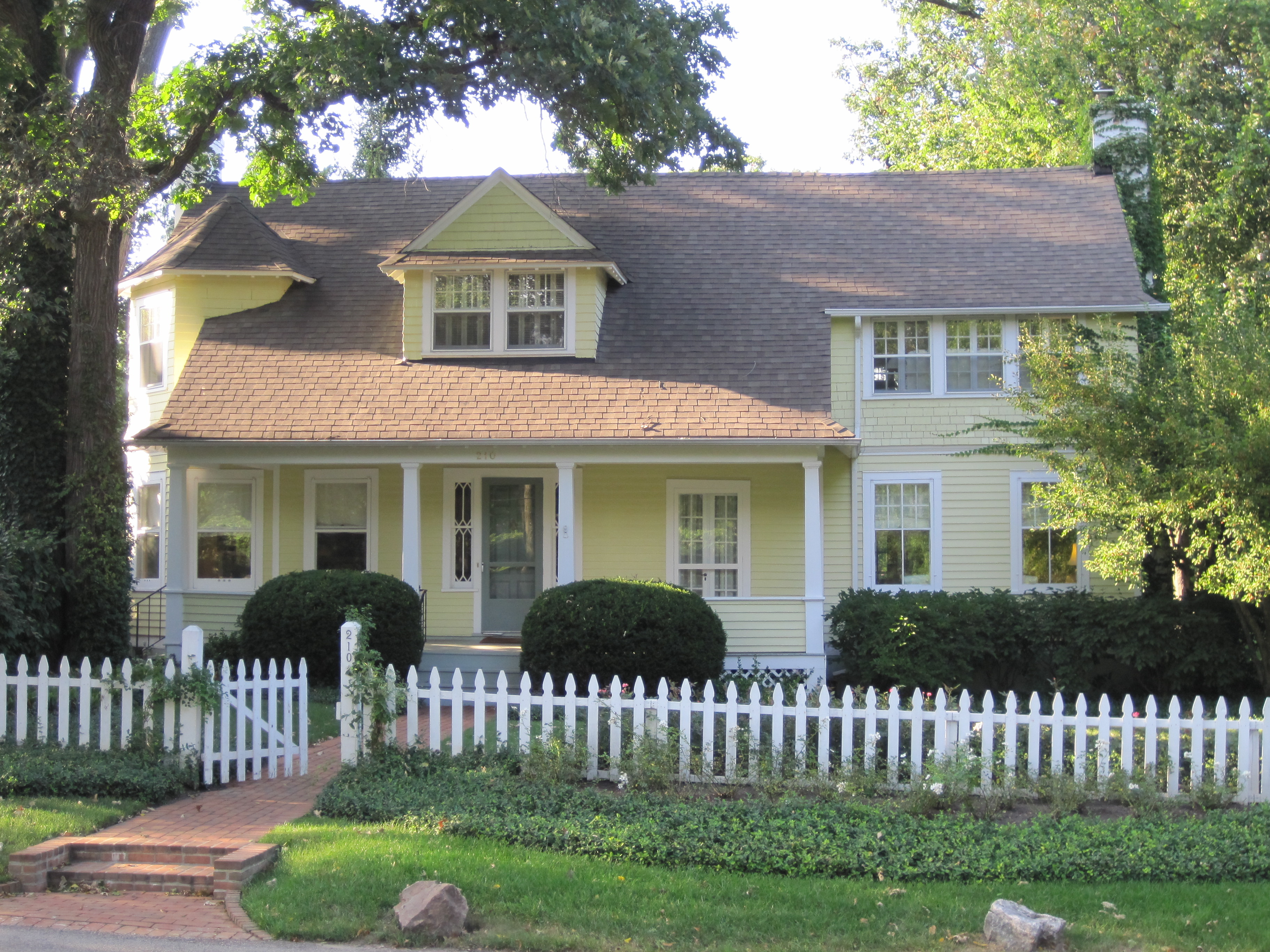
210 Vine Avenue

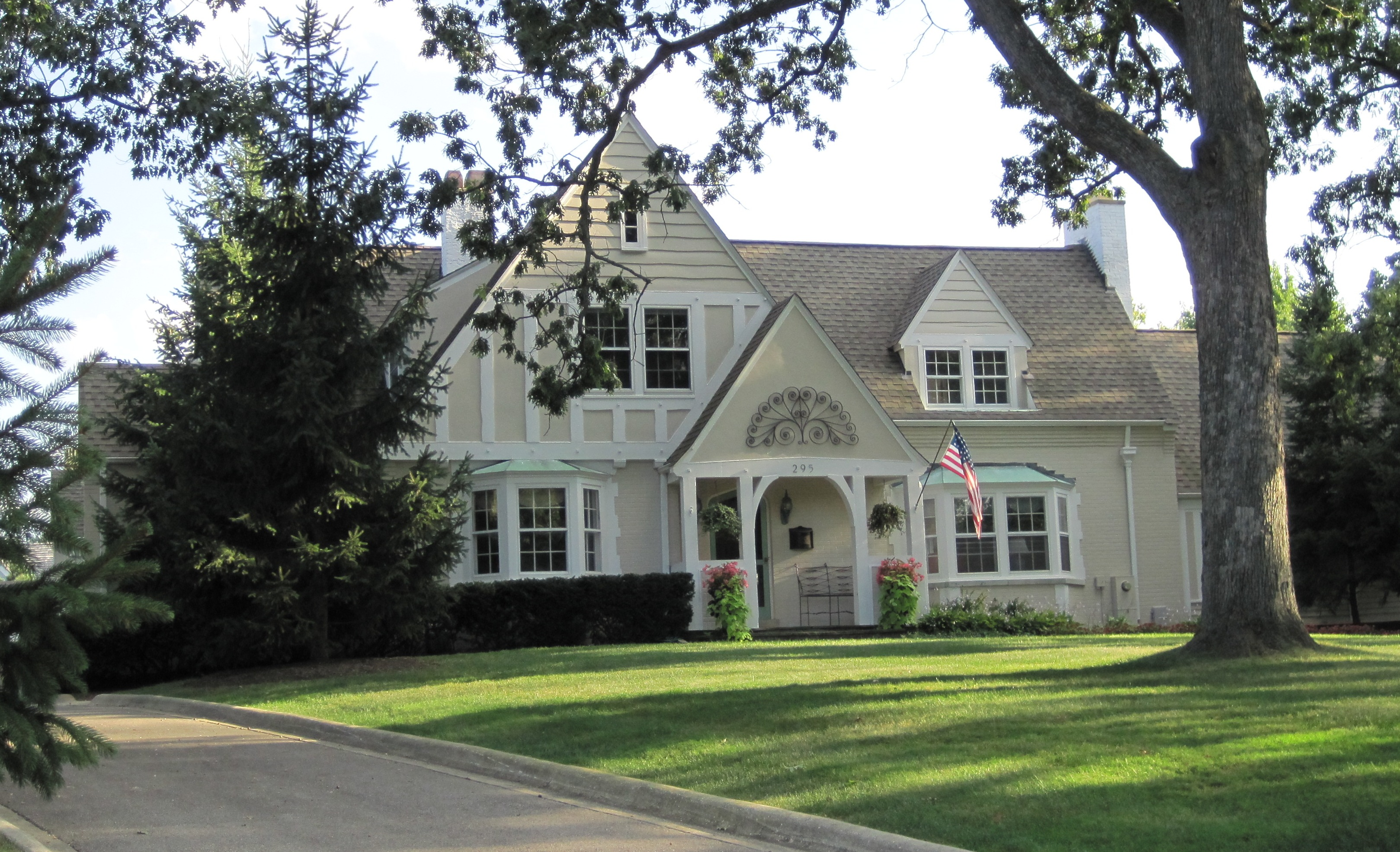
295 Vine Avenue
