= Frances Adler Elkins =

American interior designer

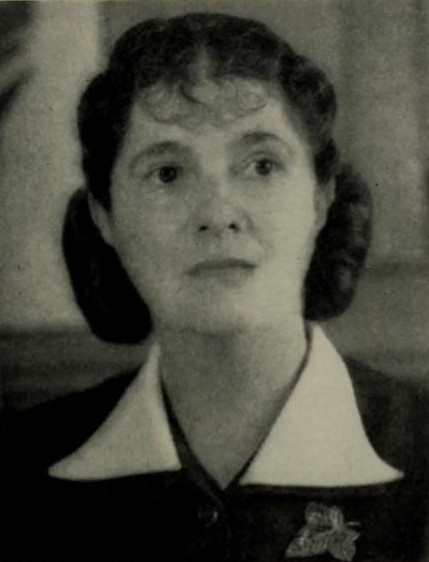
- Elkins in 1946
- Born: November 7, 1888; Milwaukee, Wisconsin
- Died: August 26, 1953 (aged 64); San Francisco, California
- Occupation: Interior designer
- Known for: Casa Amesti
- Relatives: David Adler (brother)

Frances Adler Elkins (7 November 1888 – 26 August 1953), was one of the twentieth century's most prominent interior designers. According to one magazine editor, she was "the first great California decorator". According to The New York Times, Elkins "pioneered vibrant interiors, in which solid historical references met effervescent modernist fantasy." She was the sister of the architect David Adler.

== Early life ==
Frances Adler Elkins was born in Milwaukee on November 7, 1888. Her father was a manufacturer and wholesaler of men's garments. Elkins was a younger sister of the renowned architect David Adler.

Elkins did not go to college, but when Adler moved to Paris to study architecture at the Ecole des Beaux-Arts (from 1908 to 1911), Elkins often visited him. While in Europe, she met the interior designer Jean-Michel Frank and the sculptor Alberto Giacometti. She collaborated with both, making suggestions for some of Frank's leather furniture and Giacometti's handcrafted plaster lamps.

On July 21, 1918, at San Mateo, California, Elkins married Felton Broomall Elkins (1889–1944), a playwright, painter, and polo player, who in 1911 had inherited (according to The New York Times) $2 million (the equivalent of $47 million in 2013) from his Philadelphia family. In 1918, they bought a 19th-century adobe house in Monterey, California, which they restored with the help of David Adler, and named Casa Amesti. They had one child: Katherine Felton Elkins (1920–2009; married 1947 to William Sprott Boyd Jr). Frances Elkins filed for divorce in February 1923 on grounds of desertion, after which she continued to live in the Monterey house.

== Career ==
After she divorced, Elkins supported herself by decorating houses for friends and then hotels, clubs and stores. Her first clients were Pebble Beach socialites.

Among her earliest projects was Hester Griffin's Colonial Revival house in Monterey, designed by architect George Washington Smith. In the living room, Elkins combined traditional elements such as Chippendale furniture, Queen Anne mirrors, and Ming screens with modern-day lamps by Jean-Michel Frank and Salvador Dalí. Griffin raved over the new living room.

In 1930, Elkins designed the clubhouse of the Cypress Point Club in shades of beige, yellow and melon. The furniture included overstuffed sofas and a large French provincial antique table.

By the early 1930s her reputation spread to San Francisco, where she was anointed the decorator of choice for the city's most prominent families. In San Francisco, Elkins frequently collaborated with modernist architect Gardner Dailey. In 1939, she designed an "Italian Gallery", which was shown at the Golden Gate International Exposition in San Francisco. She also worked for wealthy clients Edward G. Robinson, the Marshall Fields, and others.

Elkins collaborated with David Adler on about 15 houses in California, Illinois, and elsewhere, including Castle Hill (Ipswich, Massachusetts). She always added some unexpected elements to her brother's formal interior architecture. Examples include steel inlaid into an ebonized oak floor or Steuben glass moldings around a mantle piece.

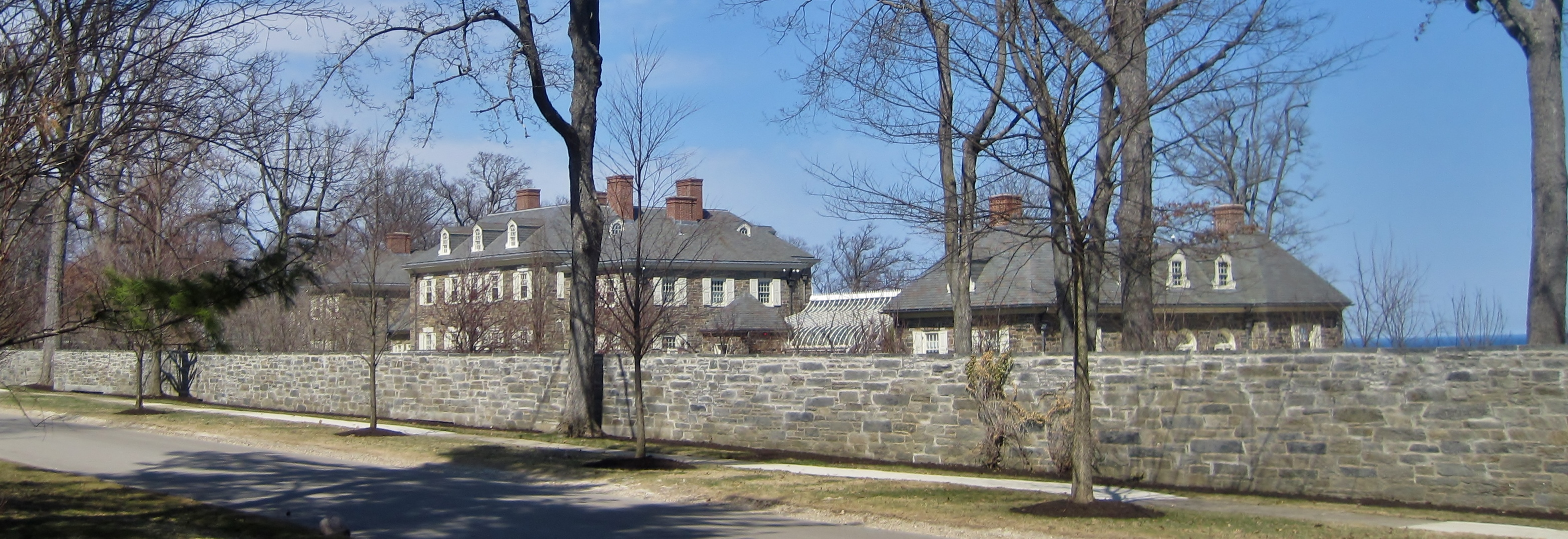
Kersey Coates Reed House in Lake Forest, IL, 2014

One Adler/Elkins collaboration was the Kersey Coates Reed House in Lake Forest, IL. Homeowner Helen Shedd Reed's one instruction was "Don't let us make this a stuffy house." Elkins was the decorator on the project. She collected parquet flooring for the home from a château owned by Comtesse duBarry, lined the library walls with goat skin leather; and covered the guest suite's walls with Chinese silk. Interior designer Mark Hampton described the library as "the most boldly stylish room I have ever seen in this country." Reed had a high regard for Elkins's taste, living nearly fifty years in her house without altering it. The Kersey Coates Reed House is listed in the National Register of Historic Places.

Elkins was at one point, the sole US distributor for Jean-Michel Frank's Art Deco furniture.

== Furniture design ==
Inspired by 18th-century chairs once owned by the founder of the English magazine Country Life, Elkins designed what is today known as the Loop Chair. Elkins made only eight Loop chairs. Four went to the Wheeler family in Chicago and four went to Marshall Field's house on Long Island. In her book In with the Old: Classic Decor from A to Z, Jennifer Boles called Loop chairs " One of the more popular conversational chairs..." Reproductions are available today.

Elkins also designed the Spider chair. The Spider chair combined Queen Anne-style legs with a Spanish-style shield back. Reproductions of this chair are also available today.

== Style ==
Elkins combined traditional and contemporary styles. She favored Steuben moldings around fireplaces, lacquered tables by Jean-Michel Frank, and sconces that Alberto Giacometti modeled after human hands. She was also partial to French provincial furniture.

Elkins often mixed whites, yellows, and blues in the rooms she designed, but the only flowers she allowed were pink and red carnations.

She was one of the first decorators to use all mirrored walls in bathrooms.

== Casa Amesti ==
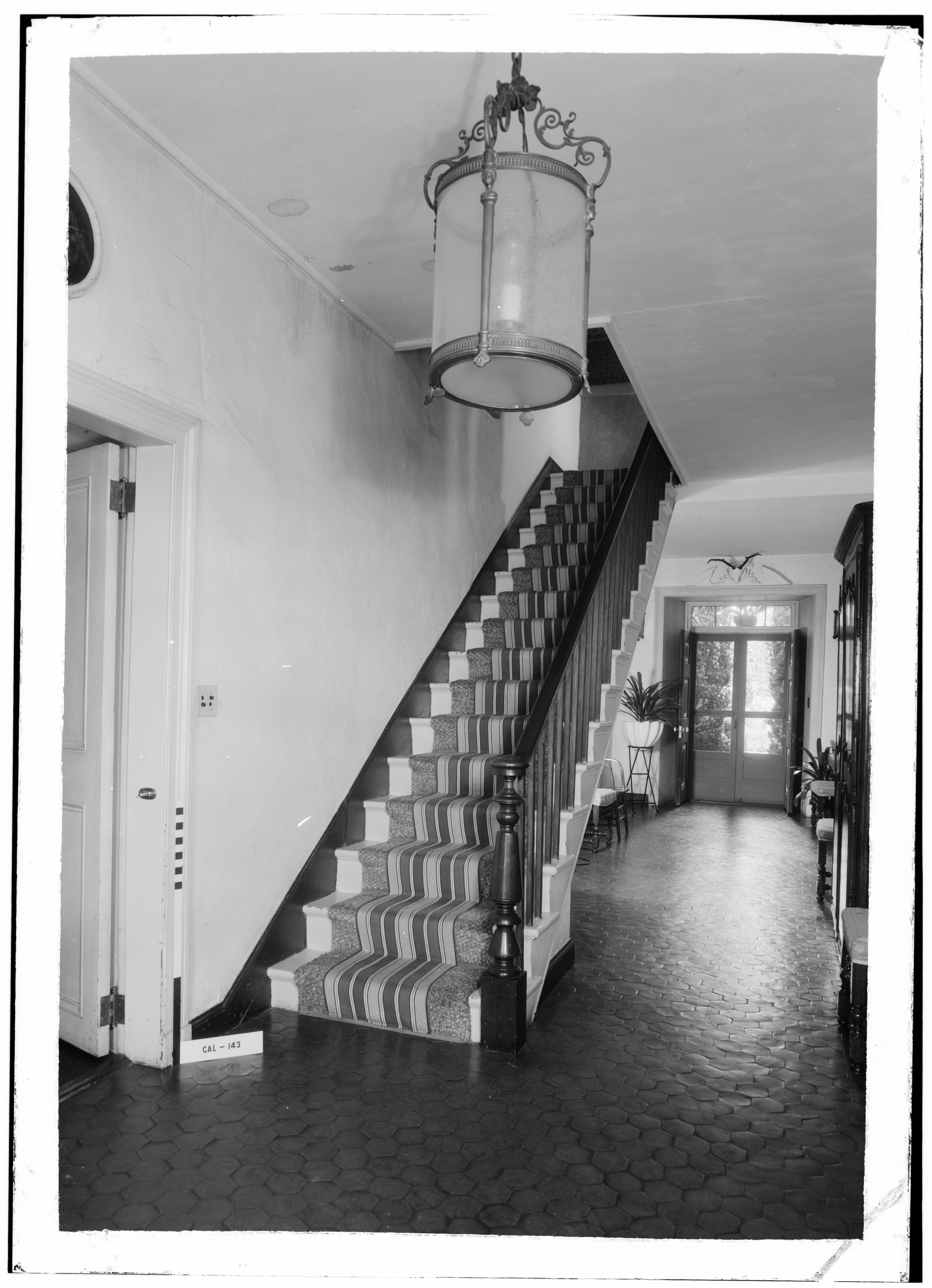
Jose Amesti Casa, 516 Polk Street, Monterey, CA, 1958

Prior to their divorce, Elkins and her husband purchased Casa Amesti (also known as Jose Amesti Casa), a historic adobe house in Monterey. Casa Amesti was originally built around 1830 by rancher Don Jose Amesti as a one-story house. Over the next 20 years the house grew wider and taller as Jose Amesti's fortunes improved. The house cost $5,000 in 1918. Elkins welcomed the challenge of restoring the crumbling 1830s building.

Casa Amesti was Elkins and Adler's first large scale collaboration. Adler installed all of the modern conveniences of the age and added details that would enhance the historic architecture. Adler juxtaposed a newly added classical features such as dentil cornices and fluted door casings against the house's rustic adobe walls and wide-planked ceilings.

Elkins filled the rooms with French and English antiques, American rugs, and chinoiserie. Her eclectic taste included 18th century Spanish portraits, Italian landscapes, a Matisse drawing, and a Parisian interior by Walter Gay. In 1924, House Beautiful called Casa Amesti "the finest of the restored old adobes."

Elkins lived in Casa Amesti for the next thirty-five years and she continued to add antique and Moderne pieces.

In 1953, Elkins died and left Casa Amesti to the National Trust for Historic Properties. Located at 516 Polk Street in Monterey, CA, Casa Amesti is leased to a private men's club, the Old Capital Club. . Many of the rooms remain exactly as Elkins left them.

In 2010, Thomas Jayne included Casa Amesti in his book The Finest Rooms In America: 50 Influential Interiors from the 18th Century to the Present.

== Later life ==
Elkins's last commission was a house for Irma and Albert Schlesinger, parents of Nan Kemper. The house was constructed in 1951 with architect Gardner Dailey.

Elkins died at age 64 in San Francisco on August 26, 1953.
