= Door Peninsula =

Peninsula of Wisconsin in Lake Michigan

Designations

Ramsar Wetland
- Official name: Door Peninsula Coastal Wetlands
- Criteria: Door County § Wetlands
- Designated: 10 June 2014
- Reference no.: 2218

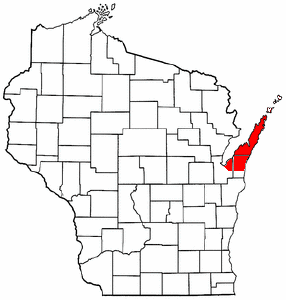
Map of Wisconsin, highlighting the Door Peninsula.

The Door Peninsula is a peninsula in eastern Wisconsin, separating the southern part of the Green Bay from Lake Michigan. The peninsula includes northern Kewaunee County, northeastern Brown County, and the mainland portion of Door County. It is on the western side of the Niagara Escarpment. Well known for its cherry and apple orchards, the Door Peninsula is a popular tourism destination. With the 1881 completion of the Sturgeon Bay Ship Canal, the northern half of the peninsula became an island.

Limestone outcroppings of the Niagara Escarpment are visible on both shores of the peninsula, but are larger and more prominent on the Green Bay side as seen at the Bayshore Blufflands. Progressions of dunes have created much of the rest of the shoreline, especially on the east side. Flora along the shore demonstrate plant succession during periods of low lake levels. The middle of the peninsula is mostly flat. Beyond the peninsula's northern tip is a series of islands, the largest of which is Washington Island. The partially submerged ridge extends farther north, becoming the Garden Peninsula in Michigan's Upper Peninsula.

== History ==
=== Archaeology ===
Native American pottery found at the Heins Creek and Mero sites in 1960 and 1961

Paleo-Indian artifacts have been found at two sites in the town of Union and two sites in the city of Sturgeon Bay. The Cardy and Salisbury Steak sites are located about a mile from each other in the south side of the city, and the Heyrman I and Boss Tavern (or Fabry Creek) sites are a quarter-mile from each other along Highway 57 in the town of Union. It is thought that the Boss Tavern site was used as a base camp, while the Heyrman I site was used as a workshop area for producing stone tools and possibly also as a very brief campsite. Both sites were occupied multiple times by Paleo-Indians.

A microwear analysis of the scraping tools found at the Boss Tavern site found that the tools had been used for butchering, skinning, and working with dry hides, and for scraping and smoothing wood. One scraping tool resembled an adze and was used to support the hypothesis that Paleo-Indians built watercraft. A layer of sand was found at the Boss Tavern site, indicating it was a beach when lake levels were higher than they are today.

The tools and waste chips at the Heyrman I site suggest that the Paleo-Indians there may have been less mobile than those who resided at the Boss Tavern site. Additionally, they appear less mobile the Paleo-Indians at the Cardy Site, which primarily used Moline chert (Note: For more on Moline chert, see the entry on Moline chert on projectilepoints.net) from Illinois, and the group at the Salisbury Steak site, which used chert and sandstone from a variety of sources.

One possible explanation for why the two sites in the town of Union featured more local stone material than the Cardy site could be from their occupants using different travel routes. The Niagara Escarpment was a local source of material to make stone tools, and because the bluffs of the escarpment stretch across the western side of the peninsula, Paleo-Indians traveling on the Green Bay side would have come across it. It has been suggested that those living at the Cardy Site may have instead traveled on the east side of the peninsula away from the bluffs. They could have arrived at the Cardy Site from an area to the east of Lake Winnebago where other Moline chert artifacts have been found.

The Salisbury Steak site was used as a stone tool workshop, and appears to have been occupied later than the other three sites. The stone materials found at the site come from only a single occupation, and include local material, sandstone coming from the south or west, and chert from the Hudson Bay Lowlands in Canada. How they acquired Canadian stone is unknown, but they could have found it in a glacial deposit, traded for it, or migrated from the far north.

As of 2007, seven Clovis points have been found in Door County, and four Gainey points were found at the Cardy Site. The relationship between Gainey points (Note: For more on Gainey points, see the entry on Gainey points on projectilepoints.net) and the more ubiquitous Clovis points (Note: For more on Clovis points, see the entry on Clovis points on projectilepoints.net) is being researched, but there are some similarities.

Careful study of certain Paleo-Indian artifacts from western Wisconsin suggests that they were made in the Door Peninsula and carried across the state. Paleo-Indian stone tools from made from stone sourced from the Door Peninsula or its immediate vicinity have been found as far west as in Trempealeau, La Crosse, Jackson, and Jackson, and Monroe counties and as far south as Dane County.

Archaeological evidence shows habitation of the peninsula and its islands by several different Native American groups. Artifacts from an ancient village site at Nicolet Bay Beach date to about 400 BC. This site was occupied by various cultures until about 1300 AD.

In 246 B.C (±25 years), a dog was buried in a Native American burial site on Washington Island.

=== Etymology ===
The name of the peninsula and the county comes from the name of a route between Green Bay and Lake Michigan. Humans, whether Native Americans, early explorers, or American ship captains, have been well aware of the dangerous water passage that lies between the Door Peninsula and Washington Island, connecting the bay to the rest of Lake Michigan. It was named by the Native Americans and translated into French as Porte des Morts: in English, "Death's Door".

The earliest known written reference to this comes from a 1728 mention of "Cap a la Mort" ("Cape of Death") in French.

The Menominee name for the peninsula was "Kenatao", meaning "cape".

=== Potawatomi and Menominee ===
Before and during the 19th century, various Native Americans occupied the Door Peninsula and nearby islands. 17th-century French explorers made contact with various tribes in the area. In 1634, Jean Nicolet, the first European to visit what is now Wisconsin, is believed to have possibly landed at Rock Island or Horseshoe Island, which is part of Peninsula State Park.

In 1665, Pierre-Esprit Radisson and Médard des Groseilliers spent the winter with the Potawatomi. Explaining his travels, Radisson reported that

We embarked ourselves on the delightfullest lake of the world. I tooke notice of their Cottages & of the journeys of our navigation, for because that the country was so pleasant, so beautiful & fruitfull that it grieved me to see that the world could not discover such inticing countrys to live in. This I say because that the Europeans fight for a rock in the sea against one another, or for a sterill land and horrid country, that the people sent heere or there by the changement of the aire ingenders sicknesse and dies thereof. Contrarywise those kingdoms are so delicious (Note: This phrase was quoted by and adapted for the title of a 1969 National Geographic article. Subsequently the adapted phrase was used for promotional purposes.) & under so temperat a climat, plentifull of all things, the earth bringing foorth its fruit twice a yeare, the people live long & lusty & wise in their way. What conquest would that bee att litle or no cost; what laborinth of pleasure should millions of people have, instead that millions complaine of misery & poverty! What should not men reape out of the love of God in converting the souls heere, is more to be gained to heaven then what is by differences of nothing there, should not be so many dangers committed under the pretence of religion! Why so many thoesoever are hid from us by our owne faults, by our negligence, covetousnesse, & unbeliefe. It's true, I confesse, that the accesse is difficult, but must say that we are like the Cockscombs of Paris, when first they begin to have wings, imagining that the larks will fall in their mouths roasted; but we ought [to remember] that vertue is not acquired without labour & taking great paines.

In 1669, Claude-Jean Allouez also wintered with the Potawatomi. He mentioned an area called "la Portage des Eturgeons." In 1673, Jacques Marquette and Louis Jolliet stayed in the area about three months as part of their exploration. In 1679, the party led by La Salle purchased food from a village of Potawatomi in what is now Robert La Salle County Park. During the 1670s Louis André ministered to about 500 Native Americans at Rowleys Bay, where he erected a cross. The cross stood until about 1870. Around 1690, Nicolas Perrot visited the Potawatomi on Washington Island. In 1720, Pierre François Xavier de Charlevoix visited the area with eight experienced voyageurs.

Six Jesuit rings marked with letters or symbols and turquoise colored glass trade beads were found on Rock Island in remains left by Potowatomi, Odawa, and Huron-Peton-Odawa Native Americans during the 17th and 18th centuries. The remains of four Native American buildings were documented at the Rock Island II Site during 1969–1973 excavations.

By the end of French rule over the area in 1763, the Potawatomi had begun a move to the Detroit area, leaving the large communities in Wisconsin. Later, some Potawatomi moved back from Michigan to northern Wisconsin. Some but not all Potawatomi later left northern Wisconsin for northern Indiana and central Illinois.

In 1815, Captain Talbot Chambers was falsely reported to have died fighting Blackhawk Indians on Chambers Island; the island was named for him in 1816. In the spring 1833, Odawa on Detroit Island were baptized during an eight day visit by Frederic Baraga. During an attack in 1835, one of two fishermen squatting on Detroit Island was shot and killed along with one or more Native Americans. The other fisherman was rescued by a passing boat. From the 1840s to the 1880s, the Clark brothers operated a fishing camp at Whitefish Bay that employed 30 to 40 fishermen. Additionally, 200–300 Potawatomi extracted fish oil from the fish waste at the camp.

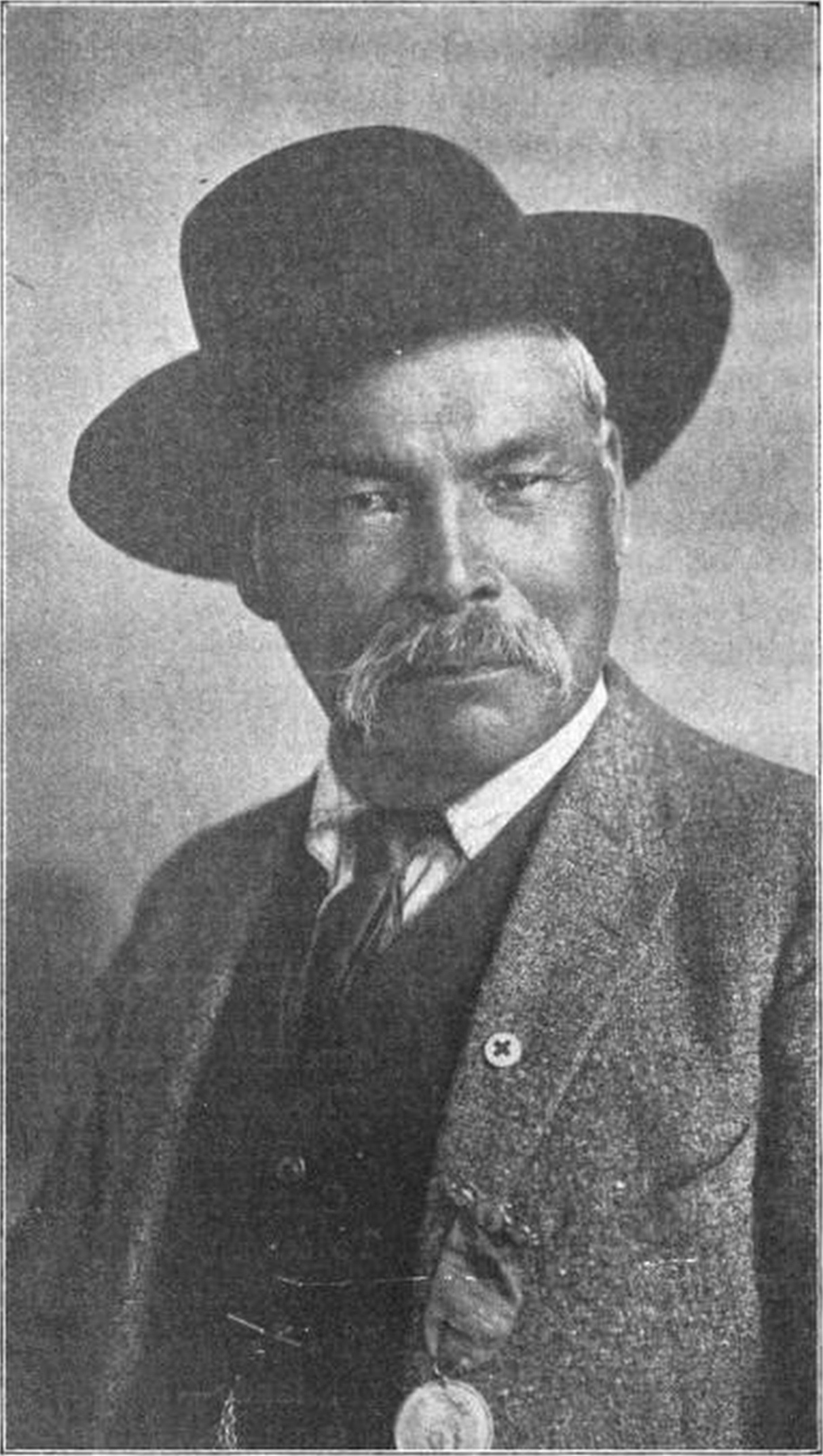
Potawatomi leader Simon Onanguisse Kahquados, 1919

The Menominee ceded their claim to the Door Peninsula to the United States in the 1831 Treaty of Washington. As a result of this treaty, settlers could purchase land, but many fishermen still chose to live as squatters. At the same time, the more decentralized Potawatomi were divested of their land without compensation. Some Potawatomi as late as 1845 made sure to visit and gamble with the Menominee shortly after the periodic annuity payments were issued. Many emigrated to Canada because of multiple factors. One factor was invitations from Native Americans already in Canada for the Potawatomi to join them. Another was British policies to invite and encourage as much Indian emigration from the United States as possible. Even prior to their final emigration, many Potowatomis had periodically migrated into Canada to receive compensation related to their service on the British side during the War of 1812 and to pledge their continued loyalty. Another factor was a desire to avoid the harsh terms of the 1833 Treaty of Chicago, which compensated the Wisconsin Potowatomi with less than what was paid to Potowatomi from the Chicago area. Although not all Potawatomi participated in the Treaty of Chicago, it was federal policy that any who did not relocate westward as the treaty stipulated would not be compensated for their land. Additionally, some preferred the climate of the Great Lakes area over that of the Plains, and American governmental policy for the area beginning in 1837 tended towards forced rather than voluntary Indian removal. (Note: See Forest County Potawatomi Community for who are descended from those chose to remain in Wisconsin despite the risk of Indian removal.) Moving to Canada became a way to stay in the Great Lakes area without risking removal.

Potawatomi leader Simon Kahquados traveled to Washington, D.C. multiple times in an attempt to get the land back. In 1906, Congress passed a law to establish a census of all Potawatomi formerly living in Wisconsin and Michigan as a first step toward compensation. The 1907 "Wooster" roll, named after the clerk who compiled it, documented 457 Potawatomi living in Wisconsin and Michigan and 1423 in Ontario. Instead of returning the land, a meager monthly payment was issued. Although Kahquados was unsuccessful, he increased public awareness of Potawatomi history. In 1931, 15,000 people attended his burial in Peninsula State Park.

=== County border adjustments ===
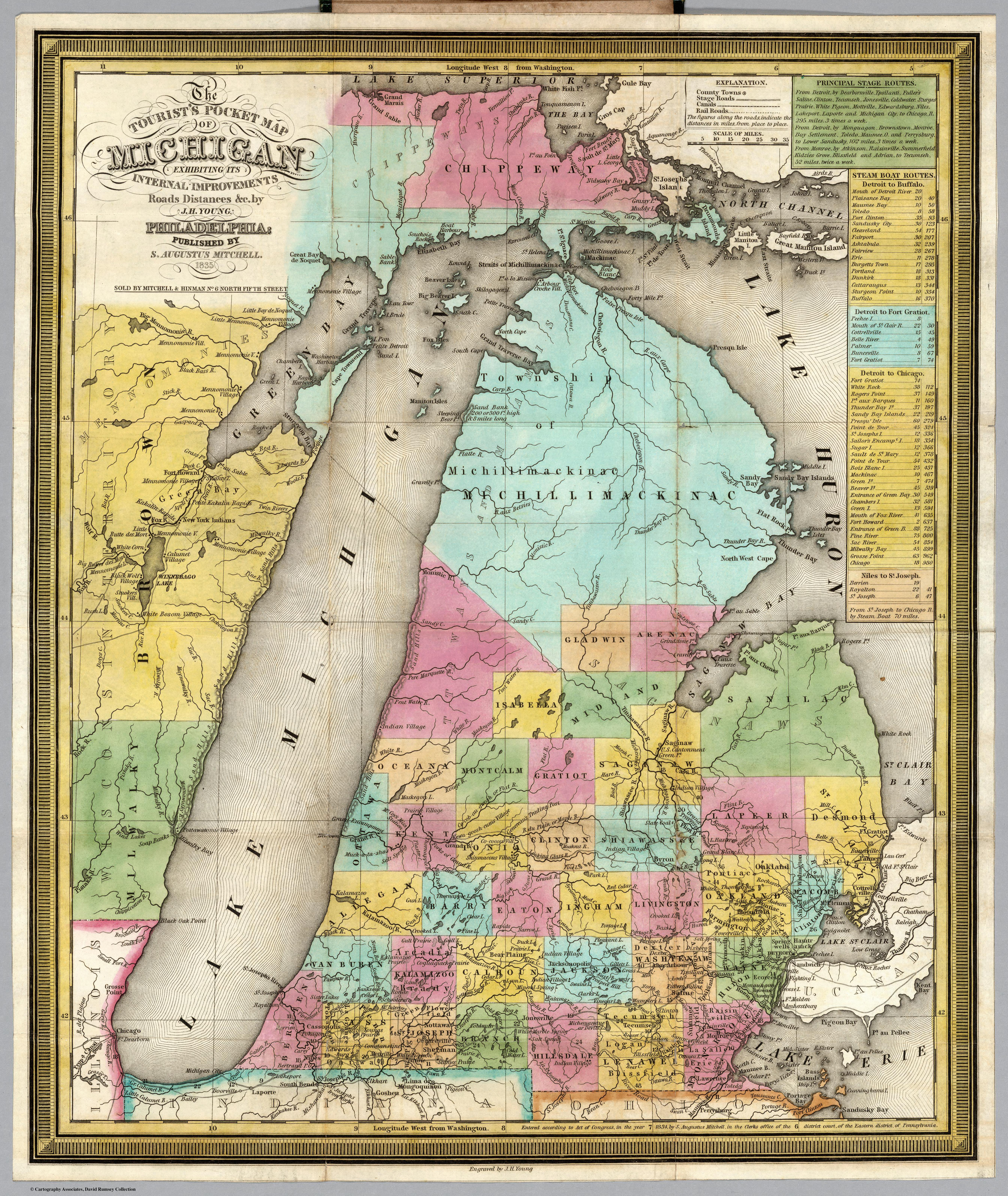
County boundaries in 1835, Michilimackinac County in blue and Brown County in yellow. The Door Peninsula is labeled as "Cape Townsend," one of its British colonial era names. Other obsolete names for the peninsula include "Vermilion Point" and "Long Point."

In 1818, Michilimackinac and Brown counties were formed by the Michigan territorial legislature. The border between the two ran through the peninsula at Sturgeon Bay. What is now the southern part of Door County was in Brown County, while the northern part was in Michilimackinac County.

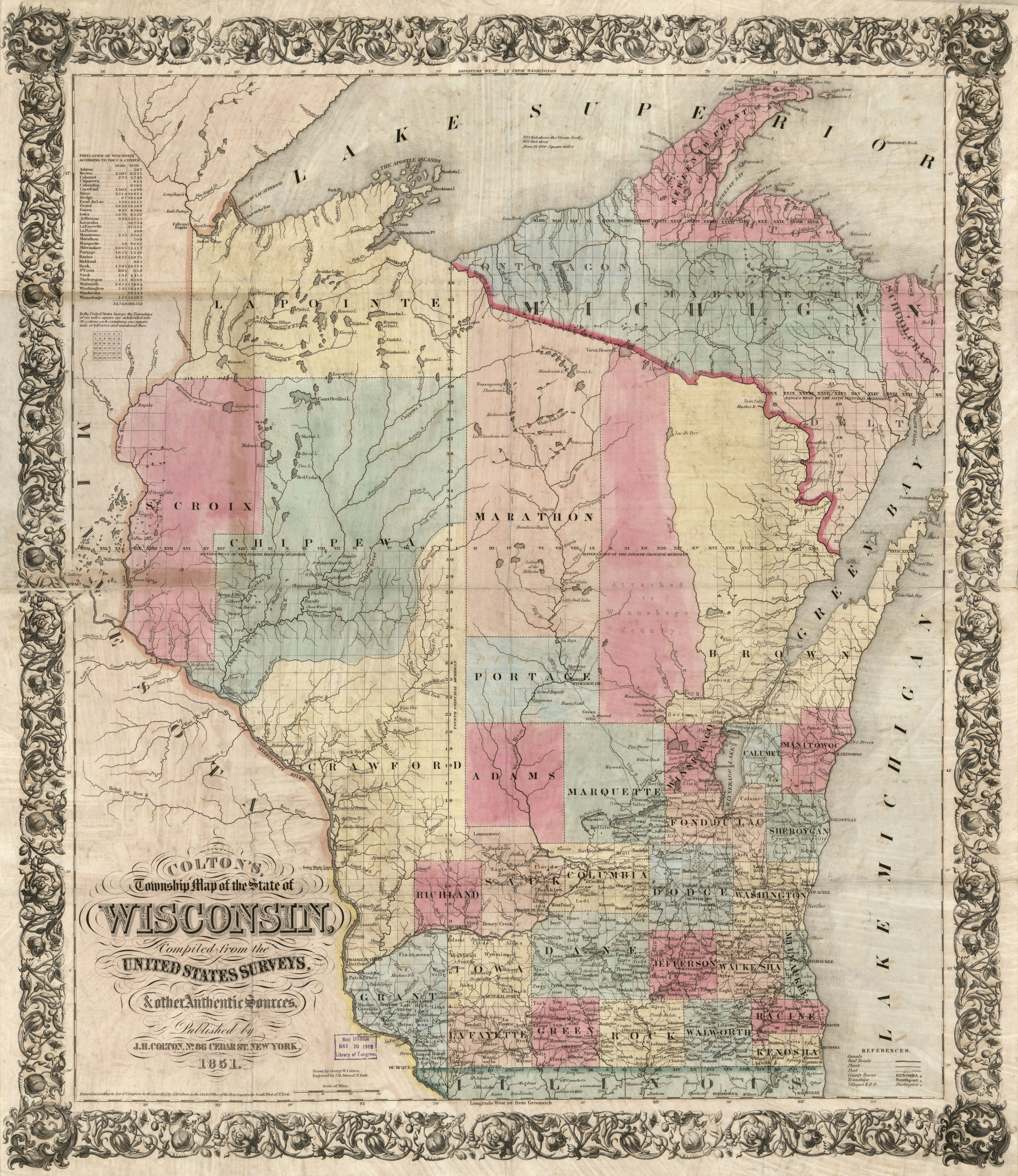
1851 boundaries of Brown County, prior to the separation of Door County in 1851

In 1836, the northern part of Door County was taken from Michilimackinac County and added to Brown County as part of an overall border adjustment limiting Michilimackinac to areas within the soon-to-be-reduced Michigan Territory.

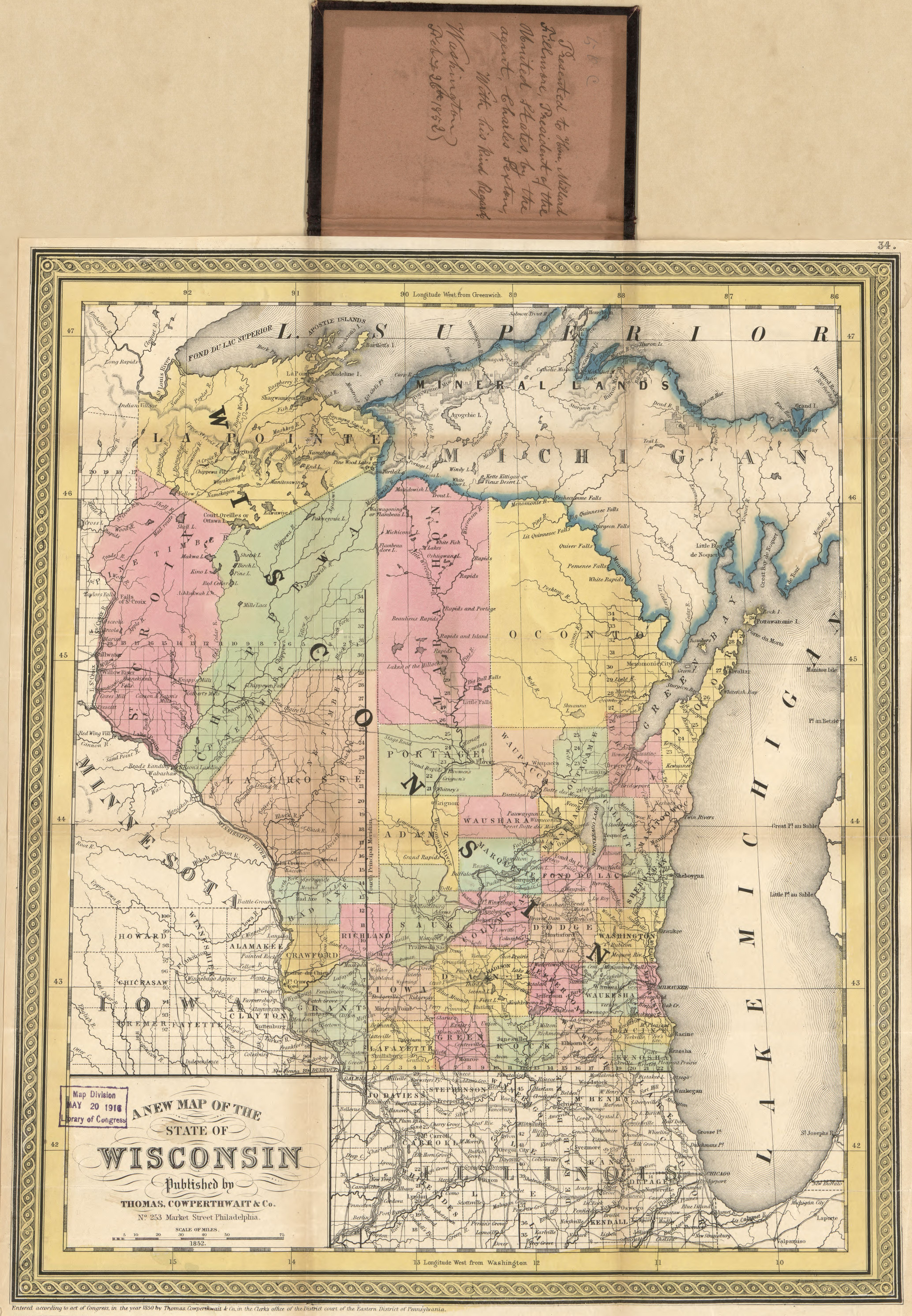
1852 boundaries of Door County, prior to the separation of Kewaunee County in 1852

When Door County was separated off from Brown County in 1851, it included what is now Kewaunee County. Kewaunee County was separated off of Door County in 1852.

Although the Door–Marinette county lines within the Wisconsin part of Green Bay were assigned to the "center of the main channel of Green Bay," not all maps drew the positions of the islands and the main channel of Green Bay correctly. (Note: For an example of a map assigning Green Island to Door County, see Johnson's Map of Michigan and Wisconsin, 1863.) In particular, some once incorrectly considered Green Island in what is now the town of Peshtigo in Marinette County to be in the town of Egg Harbor in Door County.

In 1923, Michigan claimed ownership of Plum, Detroit, Washington, Hog, and Rock islands in Door County, although it did not take possession of them. In 1926, the Supreme Court dismissed Michigan's claim. In doing so, the court mistakenly appeared to award islands north of Rock Island in Delta County to Wisconsin (and by extension to Door County). Door County never assumed jurisdiction over these Michigan islands, and the matter was fixed again before the Supreme Court in the 1936 Wisconsin v. Michigan decision, which left governance of the islands in Door and Delta counties as they had been before the litigation.

The more tourism-dominated northern part of the peninsula was acculturated from the professional and business classes of the tourists, while the more agriculture-dominated southern remained more rural in character. Due to economic, ethnic, and cultural differences between the northern and southern parts of the present-day Door County, arguments are sometimes started about the most appropriate place to draw the Door–Kewaunee line.

== Geography ==
=== Caves and sinkholes ===
Sea caves of the
Door Peninsula and Rock Island
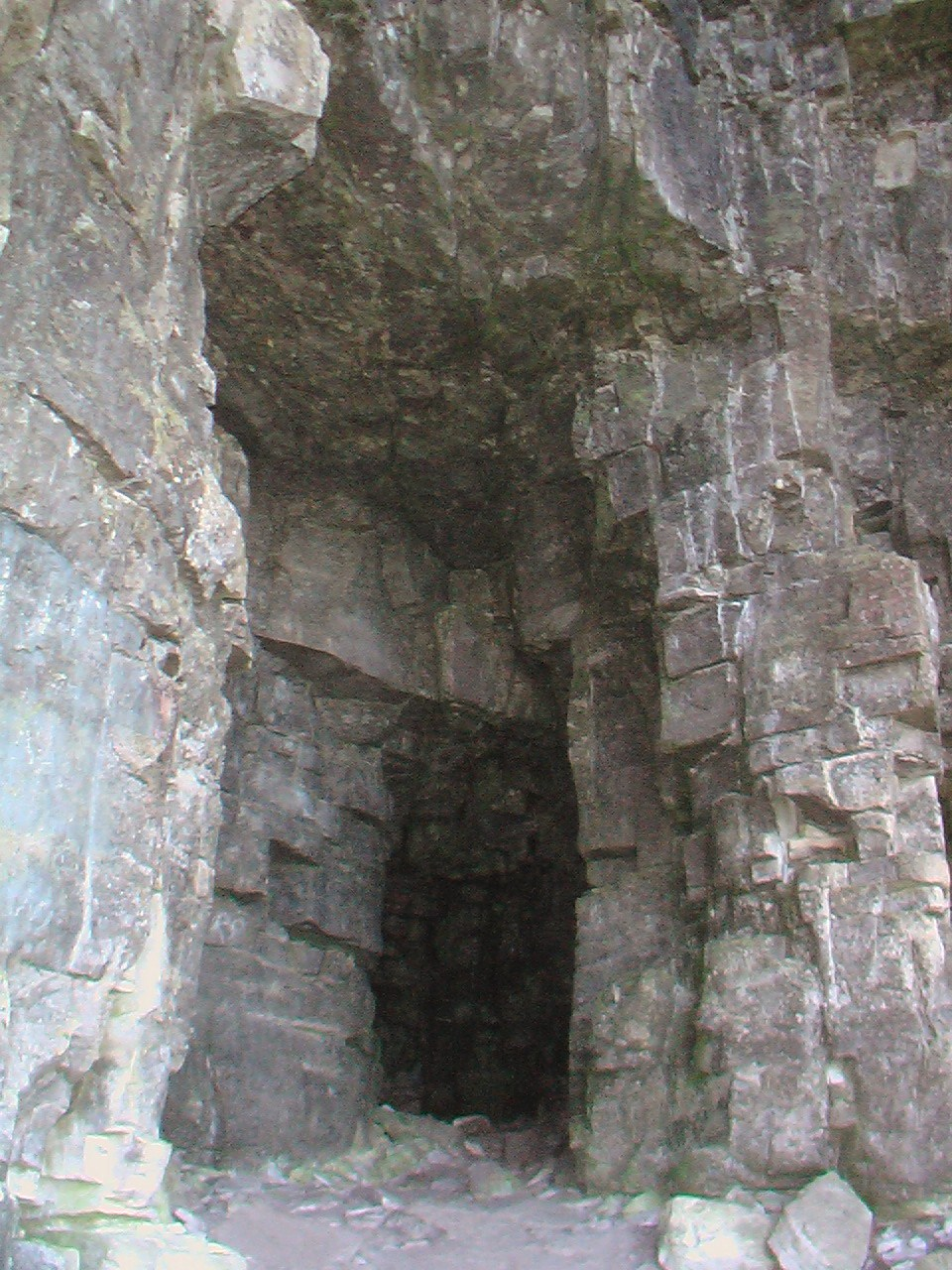
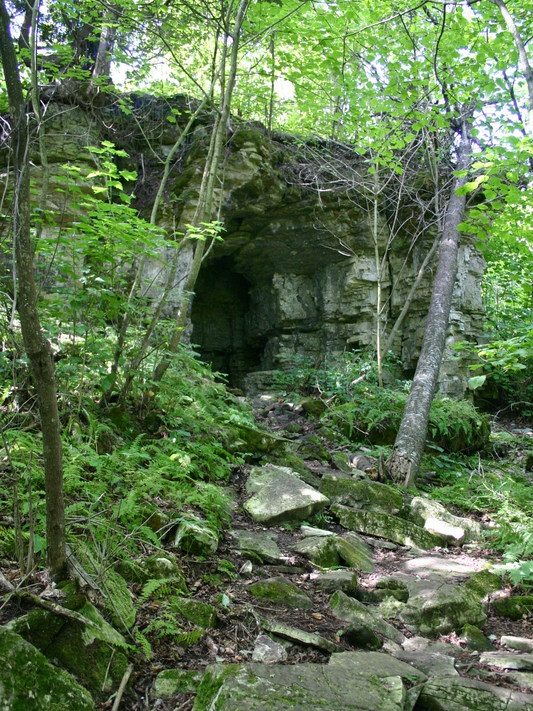
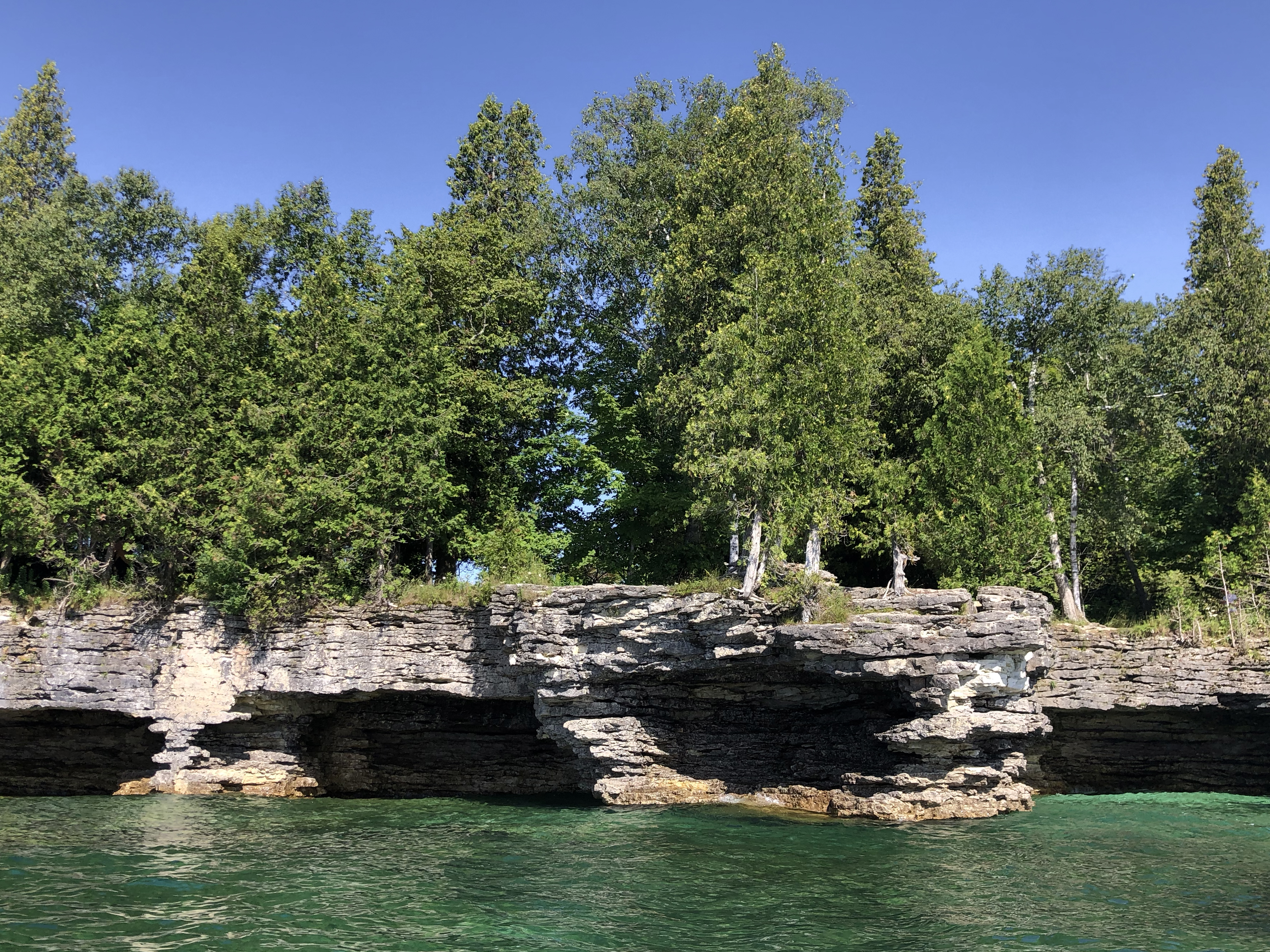

A pit cave containing the skeletal remains of both present-day and pre-Columbian animals opens at the southern base of Brussels Hill. It is the deepest known pit cave and the fourth-longest known cave of any sort in Wisconsin. It was discovered by excavating three sinkholes in an extensive project. Hundreds of sinkholes in Door County have been found and marked on an electronic map. Most sinkholes on the peninsula are formed by gradual subsidence of material into the hole rather than a sudden collapse. Some are regularly filled by tilling or natural erosion, only to subside more due to meltwater or heavy rain.

Many caves are found in the escarpment. One of them, Horseshoe Bay Cave, is Wisconsin's second-longest and contains a 45-foot-high underground waterfall. Horseshoe Bay Cave is home to rare invertebrates. Several tiny caves at Peninsula State Park are open and accessible to the public. Eagle Cave is larger but opens midway up the scarp face.

Only one cave not formed by karst or lakeshore erosion has been discovered in Door County. It opens in the basement of a nursing home in Sturgeon Bay.

=== High points ===
==== Door County ====
===== Structures on high points =====
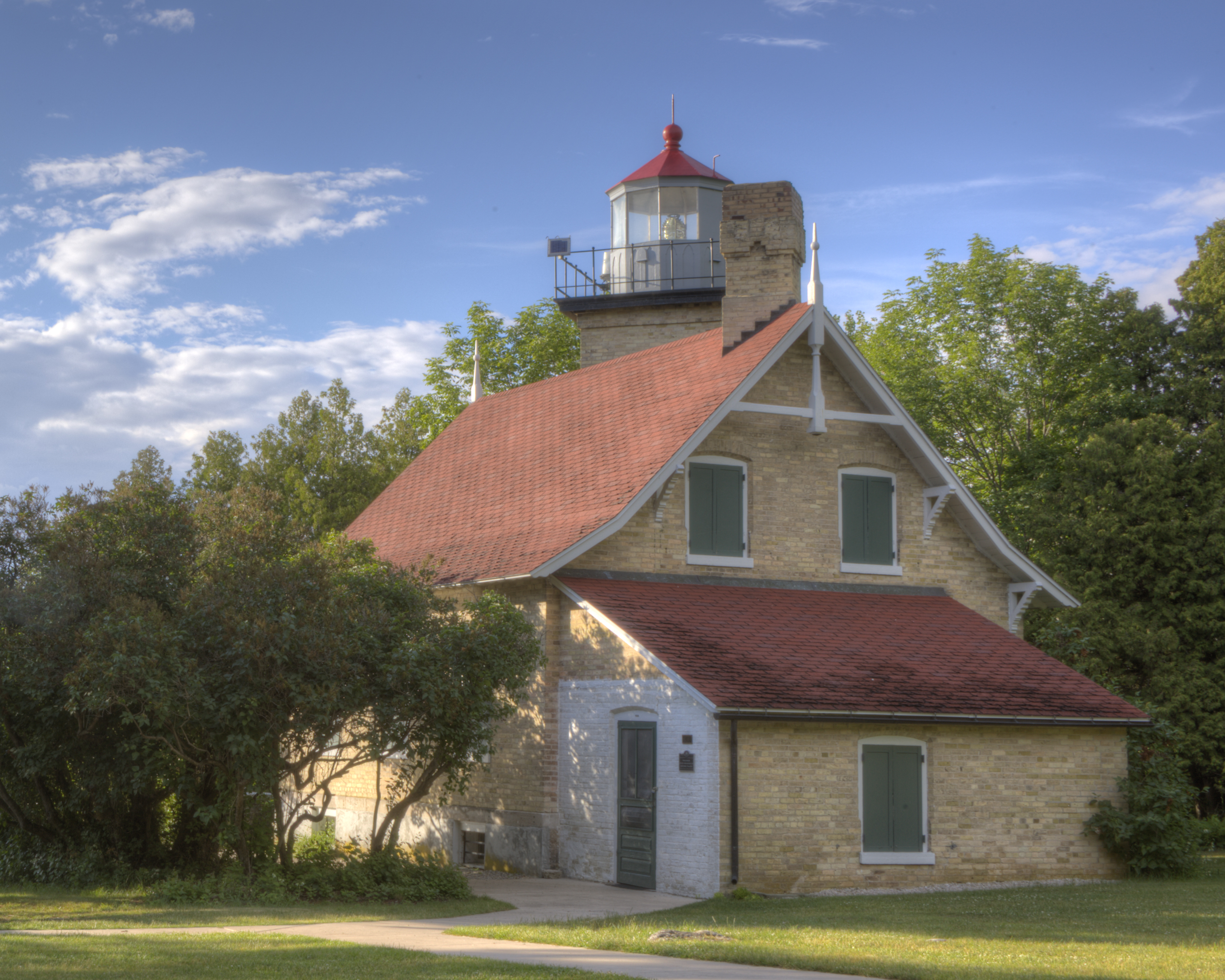
Eagle Bluff Lighthouse was constructed in 1868 on orders from President Andrew Johnson, at a cost of $12,000. It was restored in 1964 and opened to the public; it is located in Peninsula State Park.

- A tower on Brussels Hill is owned by the Wisconsin Public Service Corporation.
- Boyer Bluff Lighthouse is an 80 foot (24 meters) tall skeleton tower on Washington Island's Boyer Bluff 45.41998°N 86.93595°W, elevation 722 ft (220 meters)
- "The Mountain" at Mountain Park in Washington Island is the highest point on the island and has a lookout tower.
- Eagle Bluff Lighthouse on Eagle Bluff 45.17415°N 87.22205°W, elevation 597 ft (182 meters)
- Pottawatomie Light on Pottawatomie Point on Rock Island.
- A wind turbine project on the escarpment was completed in 1999. At the time the 30.5-acre (12.3-ha) Rosiere Wind Farm was the largest in the eastern United States.

===== Other high points =====
- Deathdoor Bluff 45.29637°N 87.06539°W, elevation 728 ft (222 meters)
- Ellison Bluff 45.25888°N 87.10234°W, elevation 587 ft (179 meters)
- Mount Lowe 44.86805°N 87.37538°W, elevation 728 ft (222 meters)
- Sister Bluffs 45.1861°N 87.154°W, elevation 581 ft (177 meters)
- Svens Bluff 45.13416°N 87.23233°W, elevation 633 ft (193 meters)
- Table Bluff 45.29915°N 87.01651°W, elevation 623 ft (190 meters)
- Certain other high points are currently unnamed

==== Kewaunee County ====
- Cherneyville Hill 44.42583°N 87.73065°W, elevation 1,014 ft (309 meters)
- Dhuey Hill 44.63777°N 87.62426°W, elevation 912 ft (278 meters)
- Montpelier Hills 44.43583°N 87.71481°W, elevation 951 ft (290 meters)

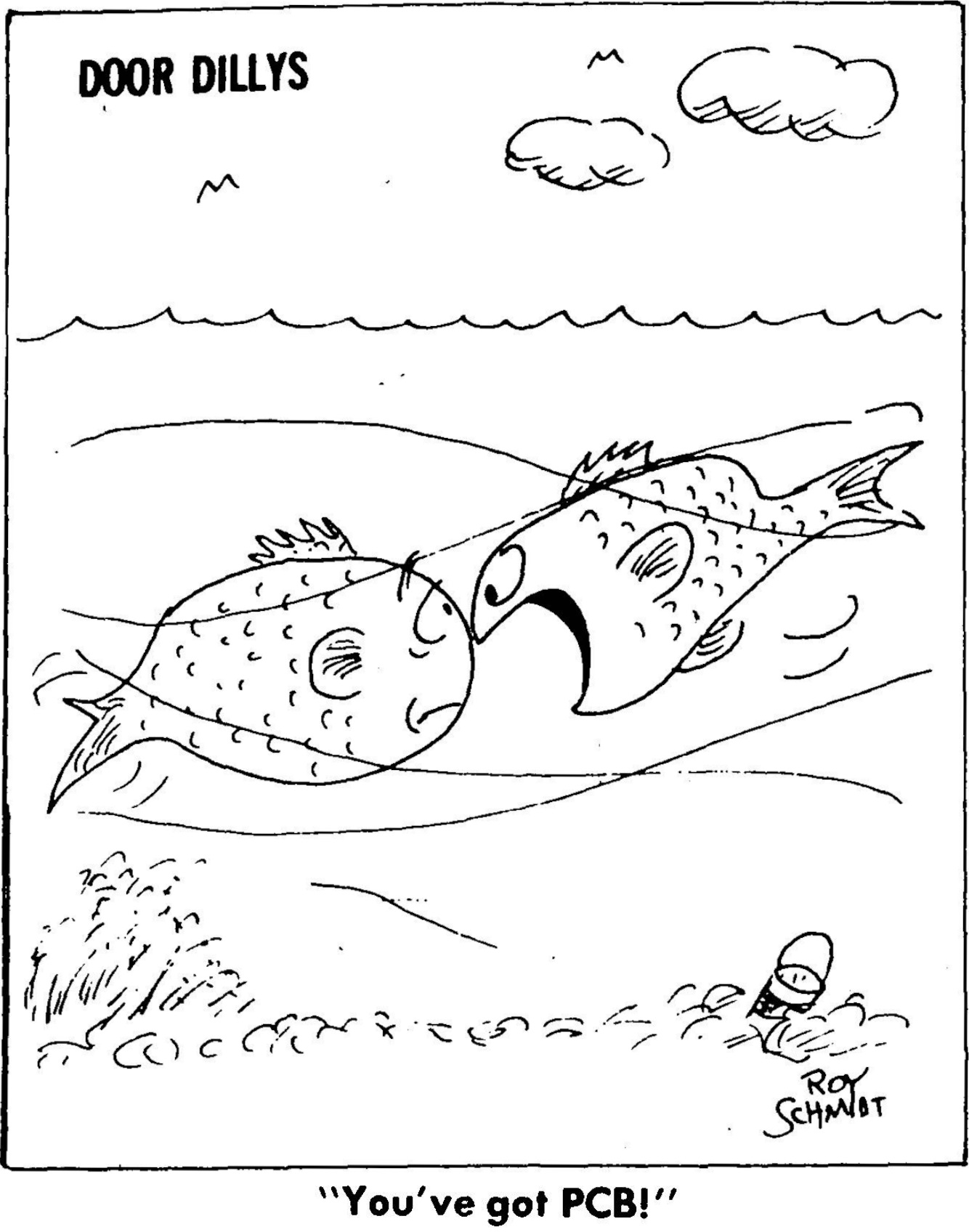
A comic drawn for the Door County Advocate in 1977 depicting a fish with PCBs.

=== Waters ===
Sturgeon Bay and Little Sturgeon are considered biodiversity hotspots because they support a large number of different fish species.

North of the peninsula, warm water from Green Bay flows into Lake Michigan on the surface, while at the same time, cold lakewater enters Green Bay deep underneath. This is a major reason why oxygen levels in the bay are often too low. In the Lower Green Bay, a counterclockwise circulation of water along the surface of the bay is thought to carry cleaner water south along the western shore, and nutrient-rich water from the Fox River north along the eastern shore. This circulation is thought to begin south of the mouth of the Oconto River on the west side. It changes direction at Pensaukee, north of Long Tail Point and continues northward to Sturgeon Bay. The position of Long Tail Point marks the east-west division between the two masses of water.

Walleye found in the Sturgeon Bay and Little Sturgeon area had 87% more PCBs (Note: This figure came from comparing an average concentration of PCBs from the whole body of the fish.) than walleye from the western side of Green Bay at the mouth of the Oconto River. This fits what is known about the distribution of PCBs which spread from industries in the Fox River Valley.

==== Dry valleys and obsequent versus resequent streams ====
Dry valleys are in the western and central areas of the peninsula. Some carry water during the spring snow melt to a larger drainage or stream, but several have been found which appear unrelated to current drainage patterns. They may have been formed from melting glaciers or drainage patterns prior to the glaciers.

Small obsequent streams flow from near the crest of the escarpment into Green Bay, and small resequent streams flow down the longer slope into Lake Michigan. The Kewaunee River, the Ahnapee River, Lilly Bay Creek and streams in the towns of Forestville and Clay Banks are all resequent streams.

==== Spawning ====
Spawning areas and other fish habitat areas adjacent to the islands north of the Door Peninsula were mapped in 1978. Lake whitefish spawn in Moonlight Bay.

From 1962 to 1965, 39 smallmouth bass nests were observed in a variety of county waters. Water depth varied from 17 inches to at least five feet and possibly deeper. 27 of the nests were made on gravel or rubble, 8 were made on sand, and 4 were made on bedrock with overlaying gravel. Adult fish were observed on 14 of the nests and eggs were seen in 19 of the nests. During part of the study carp were seen stirring up the water in Little Sturgeon Bay. This kept the water extremely turbid during the entire smallmouth bass spawning period which prevented any smallmouth eggs from hatching.

Brown trout were first planted in the Wisconsin side of Lake Michigan in 1966. They now spawn in Lake Michigan tributaries on the Door Peninsula. Fall runs are often limited by tributary flow. When low flow prevents runs into streams, spawning occurs along rocky lakeshores. Adults often lay eggs around docks and harbors along the peninsula, and most bays in the area have populations of brown trout.

===== Reefs and shoals in Door County waters =====
- Dunlap Reef 44.8375°N 87.38815°W
- Fisherman Shoal 45.36443°N 86.77984°W
- Four Foot Shoal 45.16082°N 87.00206°W
- Hanover Shoal 45.14804°N 87.31705°W
- Horseshoe Reefs 45.2211°N 87.20761°W
- Larsons Reef 44.88833°N 87.47621°W
- Middle Shoal 45.31665°N 86.93623°W
- Monument Shoal 44.99166°N 87.37371°W
- Nine Foot Shoal 45.27638°N 86.95595°W
- Outer Shoal 45.23388°N 86.96289°W
- Sherwood Point Shoal 44.91249°N 87.46205°W
- Sister Shoals 45.20027°N 87.16956°W
- Waverly Shoal 45.28193°N 86.95178°W

==== Salmon ====
Beginning in 1964, first coho and then Chinook salmon were stocked in Lake Michigan. New Chinook fingerling stocking in the spring and egg and milt collection from late September to early November primarily takes place at the Strawberry Creek Chinook Facility in southern Door County. The facility is a public attraction during stocking and collection times.

In recent years there has been concern that the alewife population will not support the salmon population, especially as the Chinook population has already collapsed in Lake Huron.

Chinook salmon are sought after by tourists enjoying chartered fishing trips. Several state record salmon have been caught out of Door County waters on the Lake Michigan side. In 1994 the state record Chinook was taken; it weighed 44 pounds, 15 ounces, and was 47.5 inches long. In 2016 the Wisconsin state record for pinook (a hybrid of the pink and Chinook salmons) was set at a weight of 9 pounds, 1.6 ounces, and 27.87 inches. In 2018, Kewaunee County ranked first in the state with 26,557 Chinook salmon caught. Door County ranked second with 14,268 fish caught.

Commercial and recreational fishing
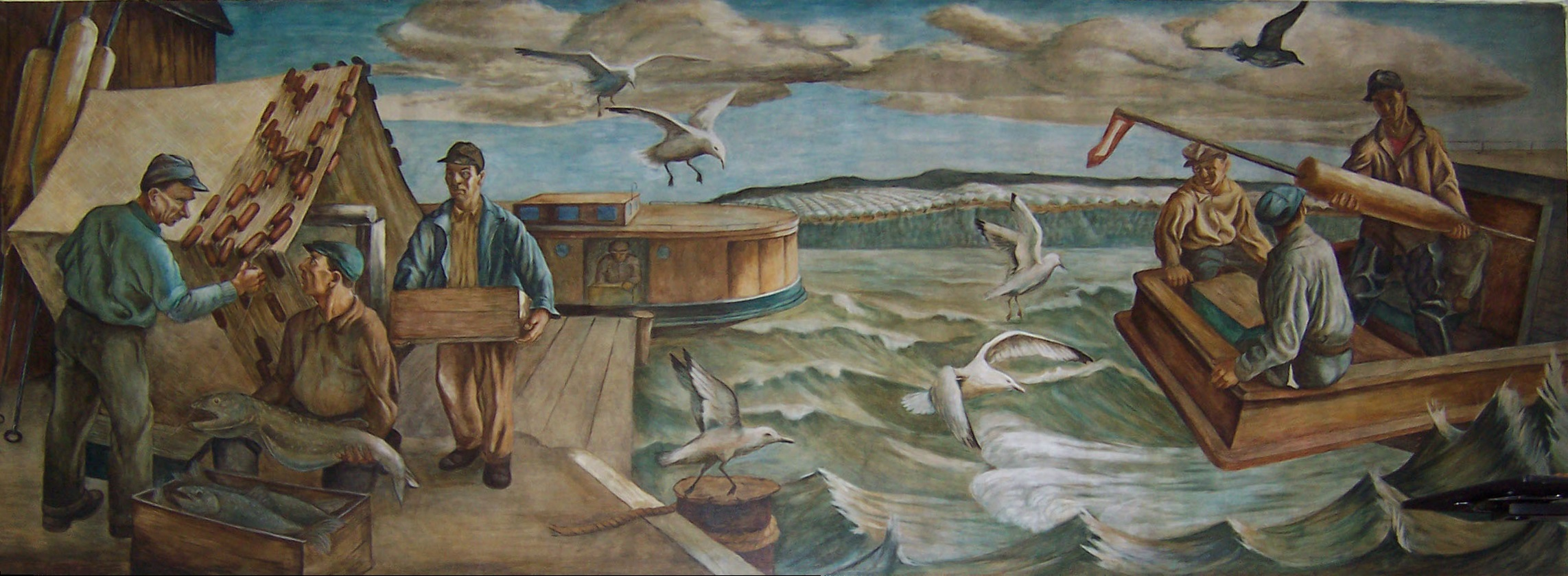
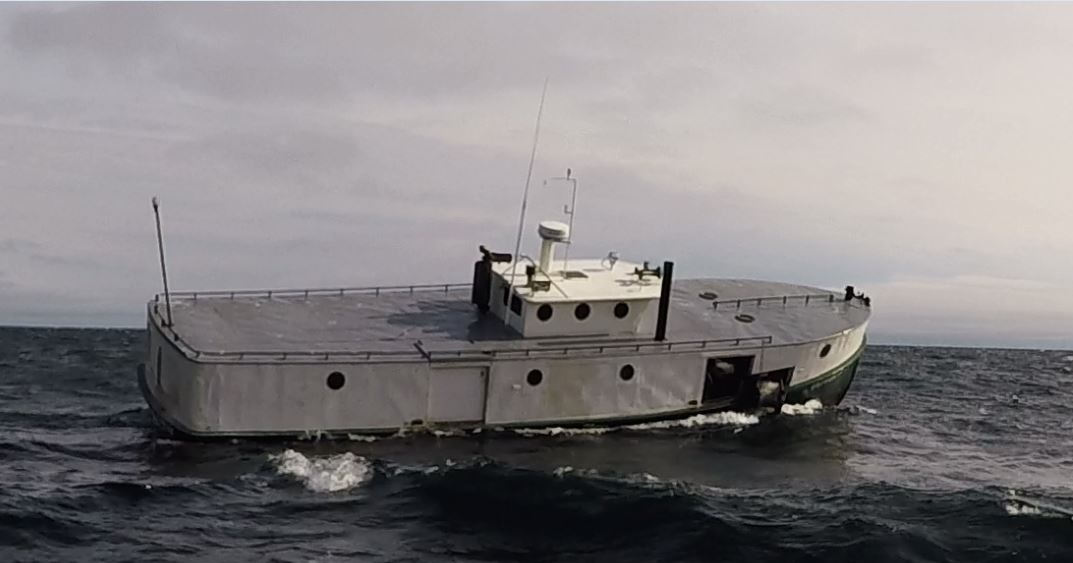
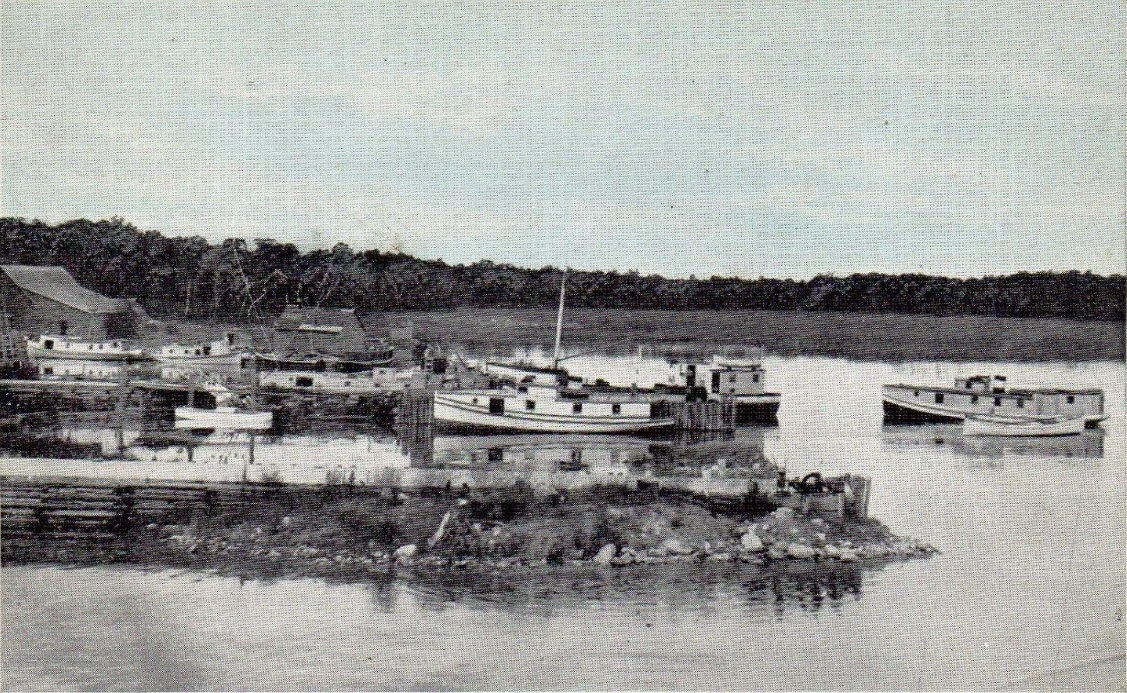
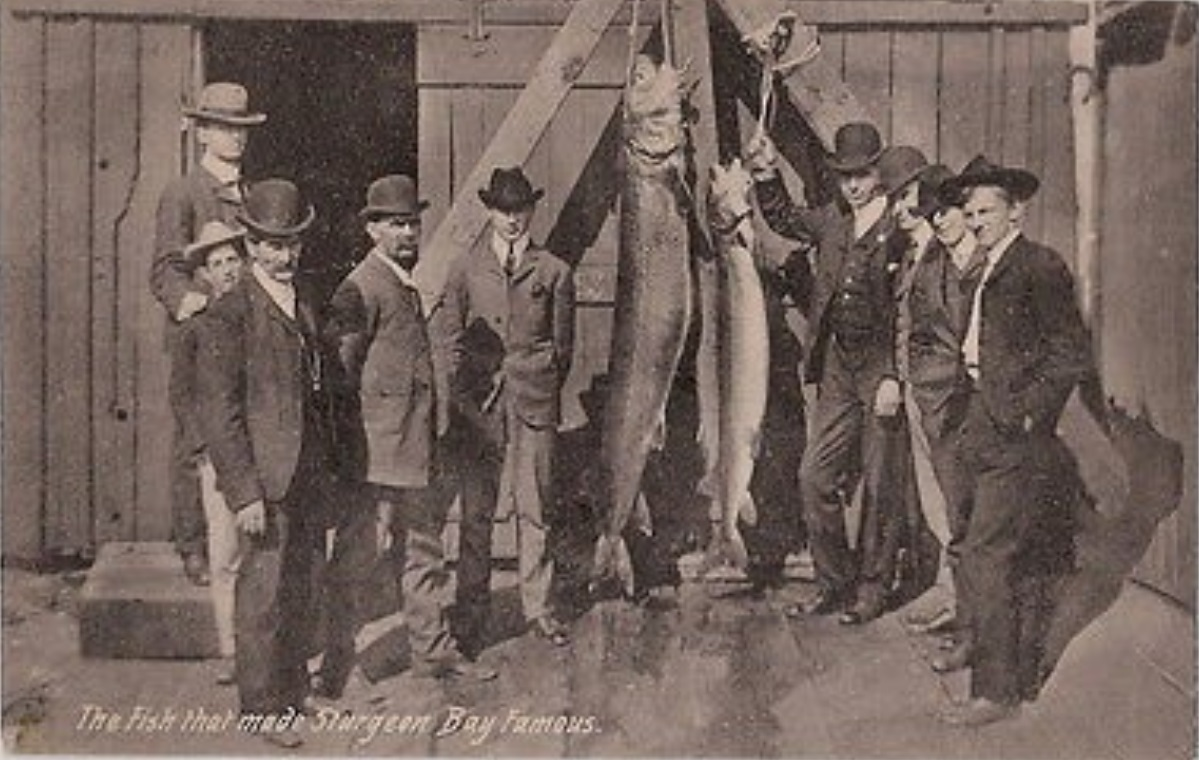
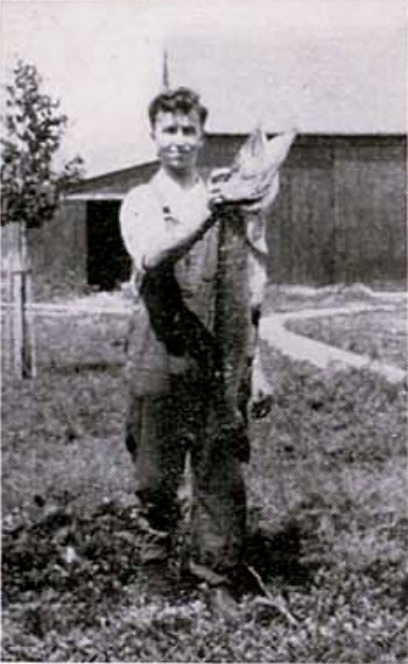
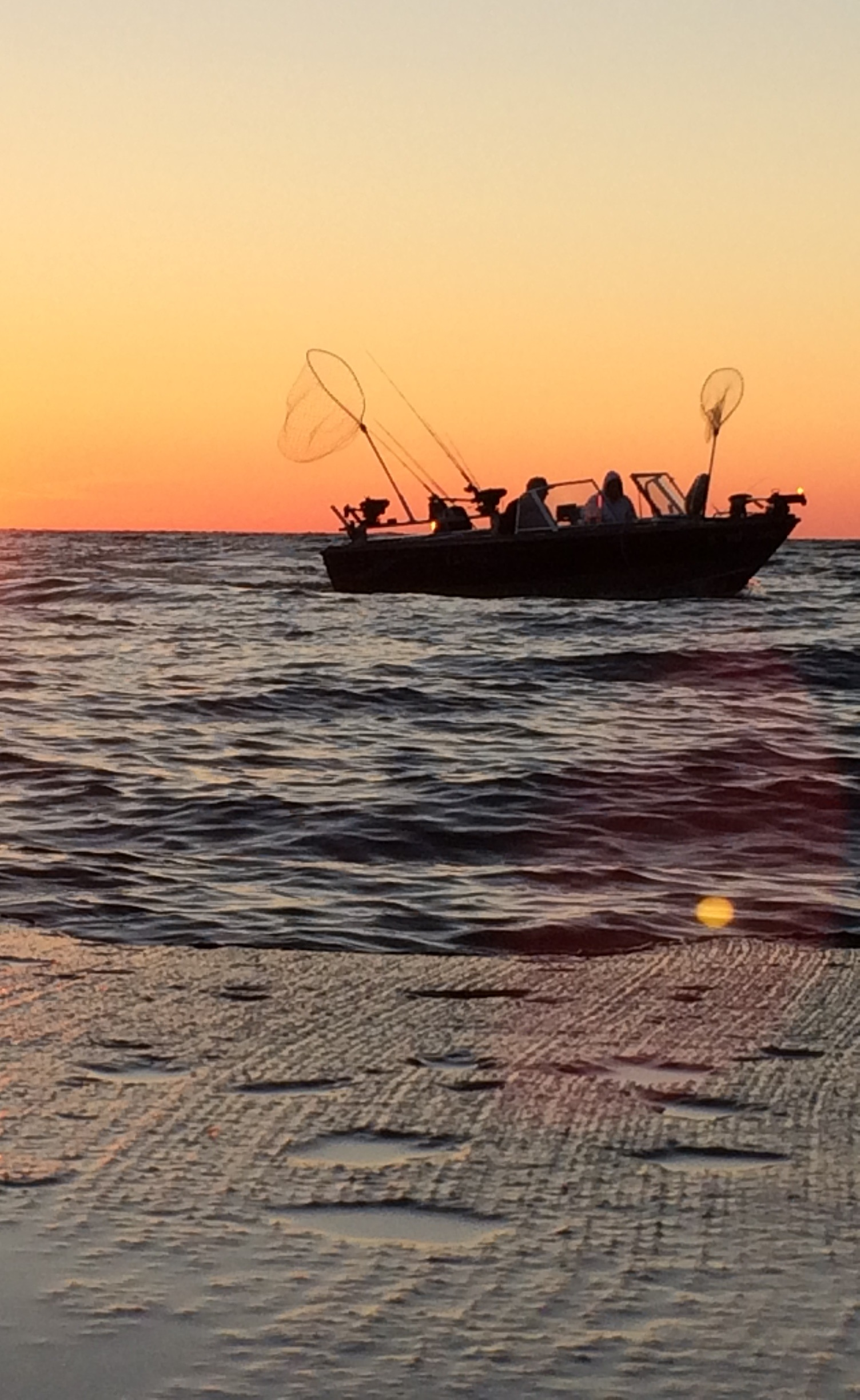
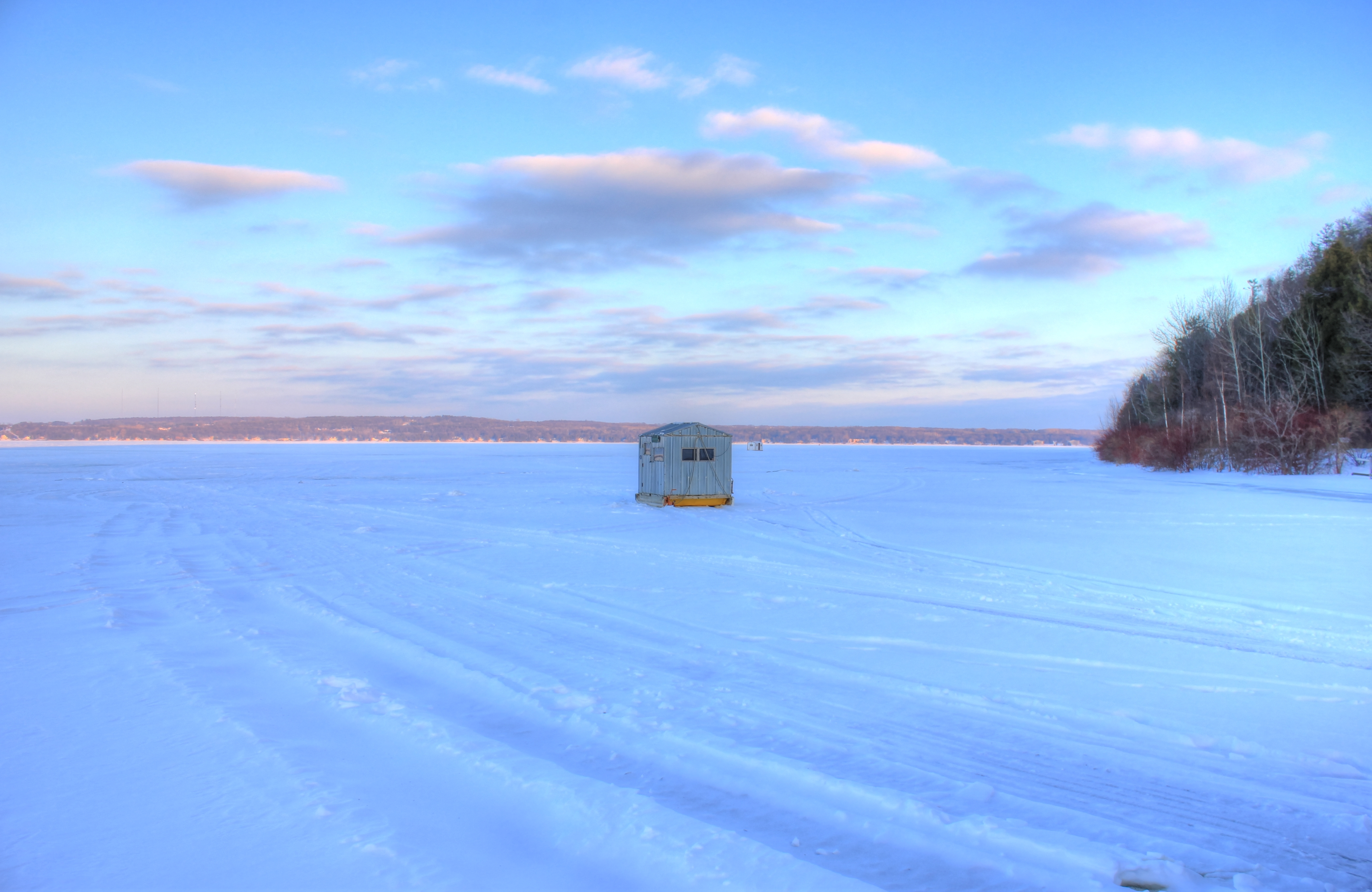
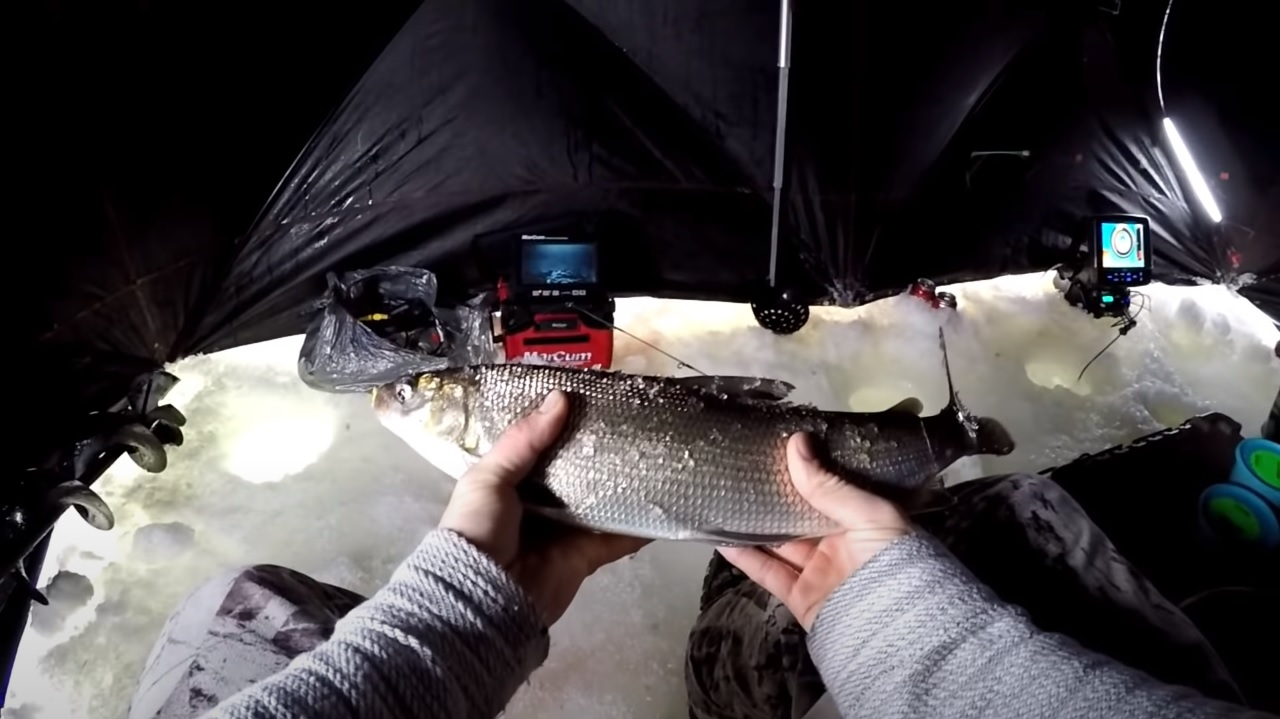

==== Other fish ====
Round gobies eat mussels off the rocky shoreline, and in turn are eaten by lake trout, smallmouth bass, burbot, walleye, lake whitefish, and yellow perch. In 2014 the state speargun record for the invasive round goby was taken by out of Door County waters on the Lake Michigan side. It weighed 5.0 ounces and was 8.25 inches long.

Tagging studies have shown whitefish migrating from Big Bay de Noc which has less food to the plentiful waters off the peninsula.

On five occasions from May through June 2017, researchers attempted to catch larval fish at the mouth of Sugar Creek using traps with green glowsticks as lures. They only caught white suckers, with the traps catching the most suckers per hour from May 15–22.

Smallmouth bass in county waters off the Green Bay side have been found to migrate more than those off the Lake Michigan side or near Washington Island.

In 2021, an outbreak of Largemouth Bass Virus among smallmouth bass occurred in county waters on the Green Bay side. From 2007–2010, two smallmouth bass within Sturgeon Bay were found to be infected with viral hemorrhagic septicemia. Each of the two bass were infected with a different variant. Both variants have only been found in the upper, but not middle or lower Great Lakes.

==== Fishing ====
Remains of sturgeon, catfish, sucker, smallmouth bass, white bass, walleye, and drum left behind by Native Americans were found near North Bay in the 1960s.

In 1965, strong restrictions from the Wisconsin DNR forced some commercial fishermen to change careers. Prior to that, fish were flown out to Midwestern metro areas the same day they were caught. Today, lake whitefish and yellow perch are caught commercially, and lake whitefish are also caught commercially by ice fishing.

In 2019, anglers spent an estimated 181,342 hours fishing off the eastern shore of Door County, 222,088 hours fishing off the eastern shore of Kewaunee County, and 1,113,129 hours fishing in the entirety of Green Bay. The figures document a decrease from 1990, when anglers spent an estimated 406,998 hours fishing off the eastern shore of Door County, 279,385 hours fishing off the eastern shore of Kewaunee County, and 1,245,291 hours fishing in the entirety of Green Bay.

==== Surfing ====
Lake Michigan shoreline is used for lake surfing. One guidebook names the shore off Cave Point County Park as the best surfing area. Another water sport is windsurfing.

== Climate ==
Door Peninsula

Climate chart (precipitation, max. and min. temperature)
J	F	M	A	M	J	J	A	S	O	N	D
57 −7 −12	54 −6 −12	60 −1 −7	129 11 −2	93 16 4	85 20 12	97 24 15	78 23 14	87 20 11	129 11 6	85 2 −1	65 −4 −8
- █ Average max. and min. temperatures in °C
- █ Precipitation totals in mm
Imperial conversion
J	F	M	A	M	J	J	A	S	O	N	D
2.2 19 10	2.1 21 10	2.4 30 19	5.1 52 28	3.7 61 39	3.3 68 54	3.8 75 59	3.1 73 57	3.4 68 52	5.1 52 43	3.3 36 30	2.6 25 18
- █ Average max. and min. temperatures in °F
- █ Precipitation totals in inches

== Rare snails ==
From 1996 to 2001, researchers identified 69 species of snails in Door County, the most out of the 22 counties in the study. Most of these were found on rock outcrop habitats. Ranking second was Brown County with 62 species. 48 species were found in Kewaunee County, ranking eighth. Slugs were found in all three counties. Peninsula State Park is home to the northernmost known population of Strobilops aenea. The species Vertigo hubrichti and Vertigo morsei are endemic to the upper Midwest. These two species had the highest occurrence frequencies along the Door and Garden Peninsulas. Door County is also home to several uncommon species from the genus Oxychilus, which is non-native and introduced from Europe. One was found near a vacation home and may have been introduced by landscape plantings. Within Door County, Brussels Hill, North Kangaroo Lake, Rock Island and the scarp face with its cool algific habitat supports populations of rare snails. Out of 63 locations in Door County where snails were found, the most species (28) were located on a cliff in Rock Island.

== See also ==
- Door Peninsula chipmunk
- Peshtigo Fire
- Wisconsin Ledge AVA
