= Lardy =

Lardy may refer to:

- resembling or containing lard
- Lardy cake, British traditional rich spiced form of bread
- Lardy, Essonne, a commune in the Essonne department in Île-de-France in northern France
- Lardy (Paris RER), a railway station located in Lardy, Essonne

== People ==
- Anaël Lardy (born 1987), French basketball player
- Henry A. Lardy (1917–2010), American biochemist and professor
- Philippe Lardy (born 1963), Swiss illustrator and painter

== See also ==
- McLardy, surname
