= Cardie =

A cardie is a shortened form of the word for a cardigan, a type of sweater.

Cardie may refer to:

- Cardie, listed by Servius as one of the Hyades in Greek mythology
- Cardie, a fictional character in 2016 comedy film Folk Hero & Funny Guy
- Cardie Primary School, in Foix, France
- Claire Cardie (1982–2019), American computer scientist
- Cardie Hicks, American former basketball player

== See also ==
- Cardi, a surname
- Kardi (disambiguation)
- McCardie, a surname
