= Cardy =

Cardy may refer to:

- Cardigan (sweater), a type of knit shirt than has an open front
- Cardy (surname)
- Cardy Raper (1925–2019), American mycologist and science writer
- Cardy, Missouri, United States, an unincorporated community
- Cardy Site, United States, National Register of Historic Place

== See also ==
- Cardi, a surname
