= Susan Deacy =

British classical scholar

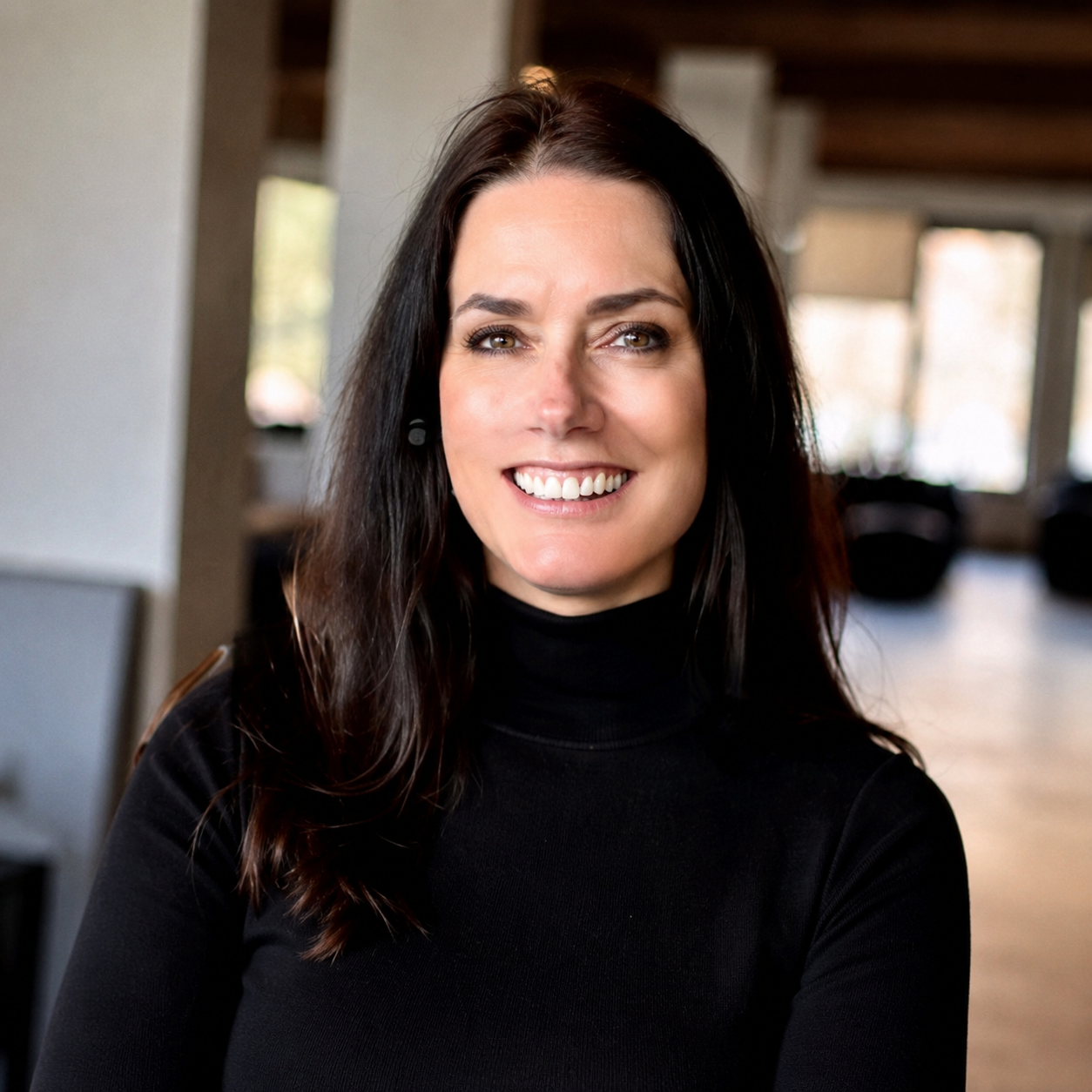
- Deacy in 2026
- Occupation: Classicist

Academic background
- Education: University of Wales
- Thesis: (2000)

Academic work
- Institutions: University of Roehampton

Susan Jane Deacy is a classical scholar who has been Professor of Classics at the University of Roehampton since January 2018. She researches the history and literature of the ancient Greek world, with a particular focus on gender and sexuality, ancient Greek mythology and religion, and disability studies. She is also an expert on the teaching of subjects which are potentially sensitive, including sexual violence, domestic violence, and infanticide; she was project leader on the initiative 'Teaching Sensitive Subjects in the Classics Classroom'. She is also series editor of Routledge's Gods and Heroes of the Ancient World, and has been editor of the Bulletin of the Council of University Classical Departments since 2011.

== Early life and education ==
Deacy was born in Cardiff and educated at the University of Wales, where she took a Bachelor of Arts in Classical Studies and Theology in 1991 and a PhD in Classics in 2000.

== Academic career ==
Deacy was a tutor in classics at the University of Wales, Lampeter (1992–1995) and the University of Wales, Aberystwyth (1993–1995). She was then a lecturer in classics at the University of Keele (1995–1996) and the University of Leeds (1996–1997). She was a lecturer in ancient history at the University of Manchester from 2002 to 2004.

In 2005, she was appointed lecturer in Greek history and literature at the University of Roehampton. She was promoted to senior lecturer in 2007 and to principal lecturer in 2011. She held the Käthe-Leichter visiting professorship for gender studies at the University of Vienna in 2010/11, where she gave the Käthe-Leichter Lecture on 'A traitor to her sex? Athena the trickster'. She became a National Teaching Fellow of the Higher Education Academy in 2015. She was promoted to Professor of Classics in January 2018.

She is a team member on the 'Our Mythical Childhood' project, which is based in Warsaw and funded by the European Research Council; it examines classical reception in children's and young adults' culture. In relation to this she also researches the autistic connection and reception of myth.

== Selected publications ==
- 2001 (ed., with Alexandra Villing). Athena in the Classical World. Brill. ISBN 978-9004121423.
- 2002 (ed., with Karen F. Pierce). Rape in Antiquity: Sexual Violence in the Greek and Roman Worlds. Bloomsbury. ISBN 978-0715631478
- 2008. Athena (Gods and Heroes of the Ancient World). Routledge. ISBN 978-0715631478
- 2012 (with Fiona McHardy). 'Teaching sensitive subjects in the classical classroom: challenges, advice, and strategies.' CUCD Bulletin 41: 28–31.
- 2013. 'From "flowery tales" to "heroic rapes": virginal subjectivity in the mythological meadow', Arethusa 46.3: 395–413.
- 2013 (with Fiona McHardy). 'Uxoricide in pregnancy: ancient Greek domestic violence in evolutionary perspective', Evolutionary Psychology 11.5: 994–1010.
