= McLardy =

McLardy is a surname. Notable people with the surname include:

- Alexander McLardy (1867–1913), a Scottish footballer.
- Andrew McLardy (born 1974), a South African golfer.
- Frank McLardy (1915–1981), an English fascist and Nazi collaborator.

== See also ==
- McHardy
- McLardie
- McLarty
