= SS Frank O'Connor =

Bulk carrier that sank in Lake Michigan

- Frank O'Connor (bulk carrier)
- U.S. National Register of Historic Places
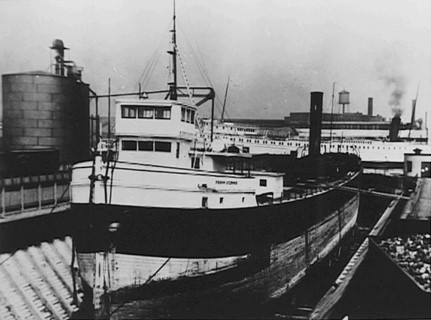
- The Frank O'Connor in dock

- Location within Wisconsin
- Location: Lake Michigan off the coast of North Bay, Door County, Wisconsin
- Coordinates: 45°6′52″N 87°0′44″W
- NRHP reference No.: 94000656
- Added to NRHP: June 1, 1994

SS Frank O'Connor was a bulk carrier ship that sank in Lake Michigan off the coast of North Bay, Door County, Wisconsin, United States in 1919. In 1994 the shipwreck site was added to the National Register of Historic Places.

== History ==
Originally called the City of Naples, the Frank O'Connor was built in West Bay City, Michigan in 1892. The vessel was renamed in 1916.

On September 29, 1919, Frank O'Connor left Buffalo, New York en route to Milwaukee, Wisconsin carrying 3,000 tons of coal. Three days later, she passed through the Straits of Mackinac and was expected to make port ahead of schedule. On October 3 at 4:00 p.m., a fire broke out in the bow. Roughly an hour later, the ship's steering gear was destroyed by the fire, leaving it drifting in the water about two miles off the coast of Cana Island. The keeper of the Cana Island Light had noticed the burning vessel from land and, along with his assistant, was able to tow the O'Connor's crew on their lifeboats to shore. A portion of the Frank O'Connor's cargo was later recovered, but the ship itself remained lost.

Despite the fire, most of Frank O'Connor's machinery remained intact and upright, making it a popular archaeological and recreational site. The ship is owned by the State of Wisconsin and the site is managed by the Wisconsin Historical Society and the Wisconsin Department of Natural Resources. She lies in 50 to 67 feet (15 to 20 m) of water about 2 miles (3 km) off Cana Island.
