= Kardi =

Kardi may refer to:

- Kardi, Iran, a village in Zanjan Province, Iran
- Kardi, another name for safflower
- Kardinal Offishall, a hip-hop musician

== See also ==
- Cardi
- Cardie (disambiguation)
