= McHardy =

McHardy is a surname. Notable people with the surname include:

- Alexander Anderson McHardy (1868–1958), British Army general
- Allan McHardy (1914–1986), Australian rules footballer
- Emmet Charles McHardy (1904–1933), New Zealand Catholic missionary
- Fiona McHardy, English classical scholar
- George McHardy (fl. 1890s), Scottish footballer
- Hugh McHardy (fl. 1885), Scottish international footballer
- Flynn McHardy (born 2007), British racing driver
- Iain McHardy (1913–2000), Scottish clergyman
- Roger McHardy (1952-2006), Australian rules footballer
- Scott McHardy (born 1970), New Zealand cricketer
- Todd McHardy (born 1977), Australian rules footballer
- William McHardy (1911–2000), Scottish biblical scholar
- William McHardy (diamond magnate) (1846–1913), Scottish-South African diamond magnate

== Other uses ==
- Geniatech v. McHardy, a 2018 German court case looking at licensing infringements in relation to the Linux kernel
