= Cardy (surname) =

Cardy is a surname. Notable people with the surname include:

- Alan Cardy, representative of Australia in rugby union
- Dominic Cardy (born 1970), English born Canadian politician
- Jennifer Cardy, Irish victim of serial killer Robert Black
- John Cardy, British theoretical physicist
- Julien Cardy (born 1981), midfielder in the French Football League
- Nick Cardy (1920–2013), American comic book artist
- Peter Cardy, British activist
- Tom Cardy, Australian comedian and musician

== See also ==
- Cardy (disambiguation)
- Caddy (name)
- Cardi, surname
- Carry (name)
