= McCurrie =

McCurrie is a surname. Notable people with the surname include:

- Alan McCurrie (born 1953), English rugby league player
- Paul McCurrie (1929–2010), American lawyer and politician
- Steve McCurrie (born 1973), English rugby league player, son of Alan

== See also ==
- McCurdie
