= Liberty Grove, Wisconsin =

- Town
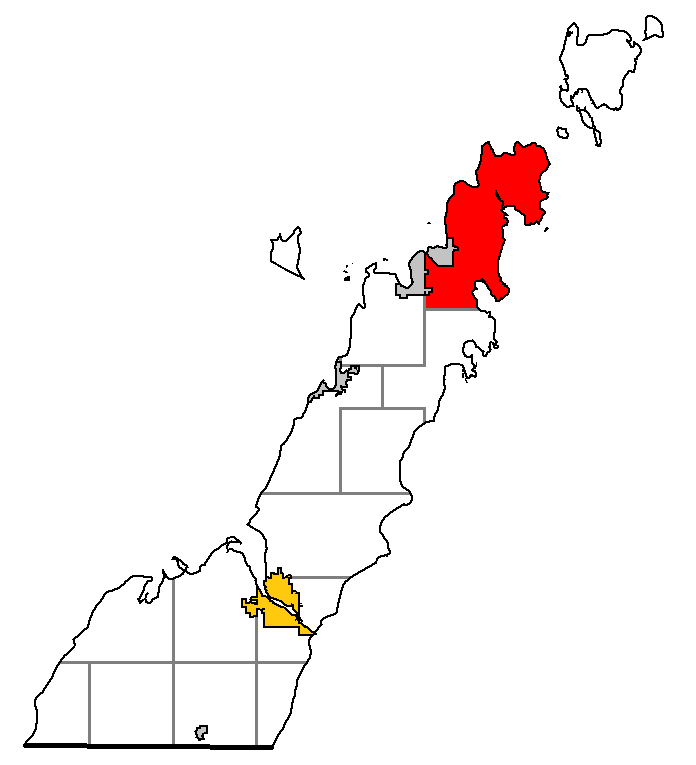
- Location of Liberty Grove, within Door County
- Coordinates: 45°13′8″N 87°3′58″W
- Country: United States
- State: Wisconsin
- County: Door

Area
  - Total: 189.5 sq mi (490.7 km^{2})
  - Land: 53.6 sq mi (138.8 km^{2})
  - Water: 135.9 sq mi (351.9 km^{2})
- Elevation: 614 ft (187 m)

Population (2020)
  - Total: 2,096
  - Density: 39.11/sq mi (15.10/km^{2})
- Time zone: UTC-6 (Central (CST))
  - Summer (DST): UTC-5 (CDT)
- Area code: 920
- FIPS code: 55-43925
- GNIS feature ID: 1583554
- Website: https://libertygrovewi.gov/

Liberty Grove is a town in Door County, Wisconsin, United States. The population was 2,096 at the 2020 census. The unincorporated communities of Ellison Bay, Gills Rock, North Bay, Northport, and Rowleys Bay are in the town.

== History ==
Liberty Grove was formed from the northern Gibraltar Township in 1859. The state of Wisconsin was less than a decade old at the time. The early settlers at the time harvested the quality timber, fished the fish, and planted the cheap farmland. Some import early settlers in Liberty Grove include, Allen Bradley, Daniel Rice, and Andrew Weborg.

== Geography ==
According to the United States Census Bureau, the town has a total area of 189.5 square miles (490.7 km^{2}), of which 53.6 square miles (138.8 km^{2}) of land and 135.9 square miles (352.0 km^{2}) (71.72%) is water.

== Demographics ==
As of the census of 2018, there were 1,750 people, 824 households, and 589 families residing in the town. The population density was 34.7 people per square mile (13.4/km^{2}). There were 2,000 housing units at an average density of 37.3 per square mile (14.4/km^{2}). The racial makeup of the town was 99.35% White, 0.05% Native American, 0.11% Asian, 0.16% from other races, and 0.32% from two or more races. Hispanic or Latino of any race were 0.54% of the population.

There were 824 households, out of which 22.0% had children under the age of 18 living with them, 64.3% were married couples living together, 6.2% had a female householder with no husband present, and 28.4% were non-families. 25.2% of all households were made up of individuals, and 12.6% had someone living alone who was 65 years of age or older. The average household size was 2.25 and the average family size was 2.69.

In the town, the population was spread out, with 19.2% under the age of 18, 3.6% from 18 to 24, 20.6% from 25 to 44, 32.9% from 45 to 64, and 23.7% who were 65 years of age or older. The median age was 49 years. For every 100 females, there were 93.3 males. For every 100 females age 18 and over, there were 90.1 males.

The median income for a household in the town was $43,472, and the median income for a family was $49,107. Males had a median income of $30,673 versus $25,341 for females. The per capita income for the town was $24,555. About 3.0% of families and 4.0% of the population were below the poverty line, including 6.1% of those under age 18 and 7.3% of those age 65 or over.

== Gallery ==
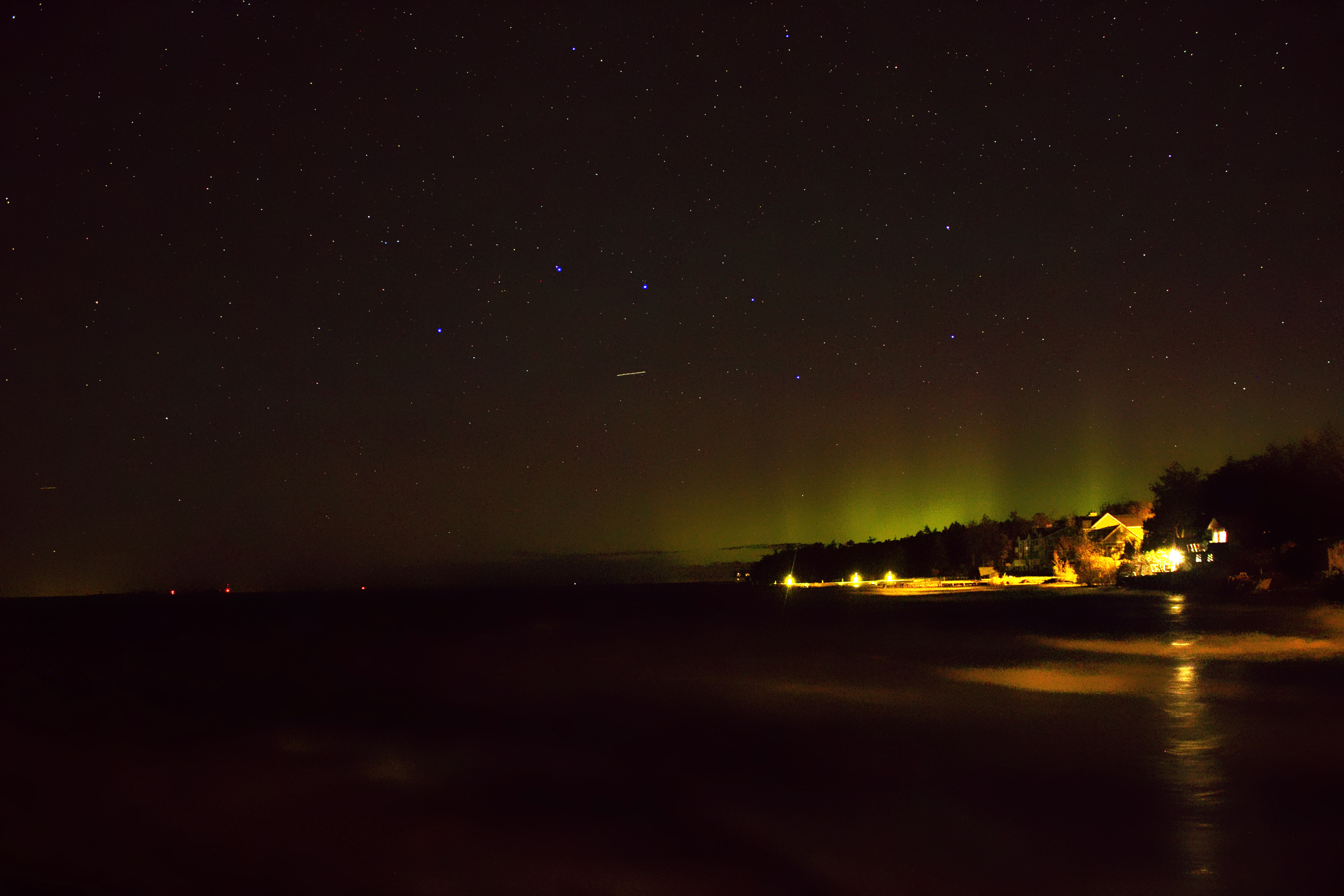
An aurora in the sky above Liberty Grove in 2015.

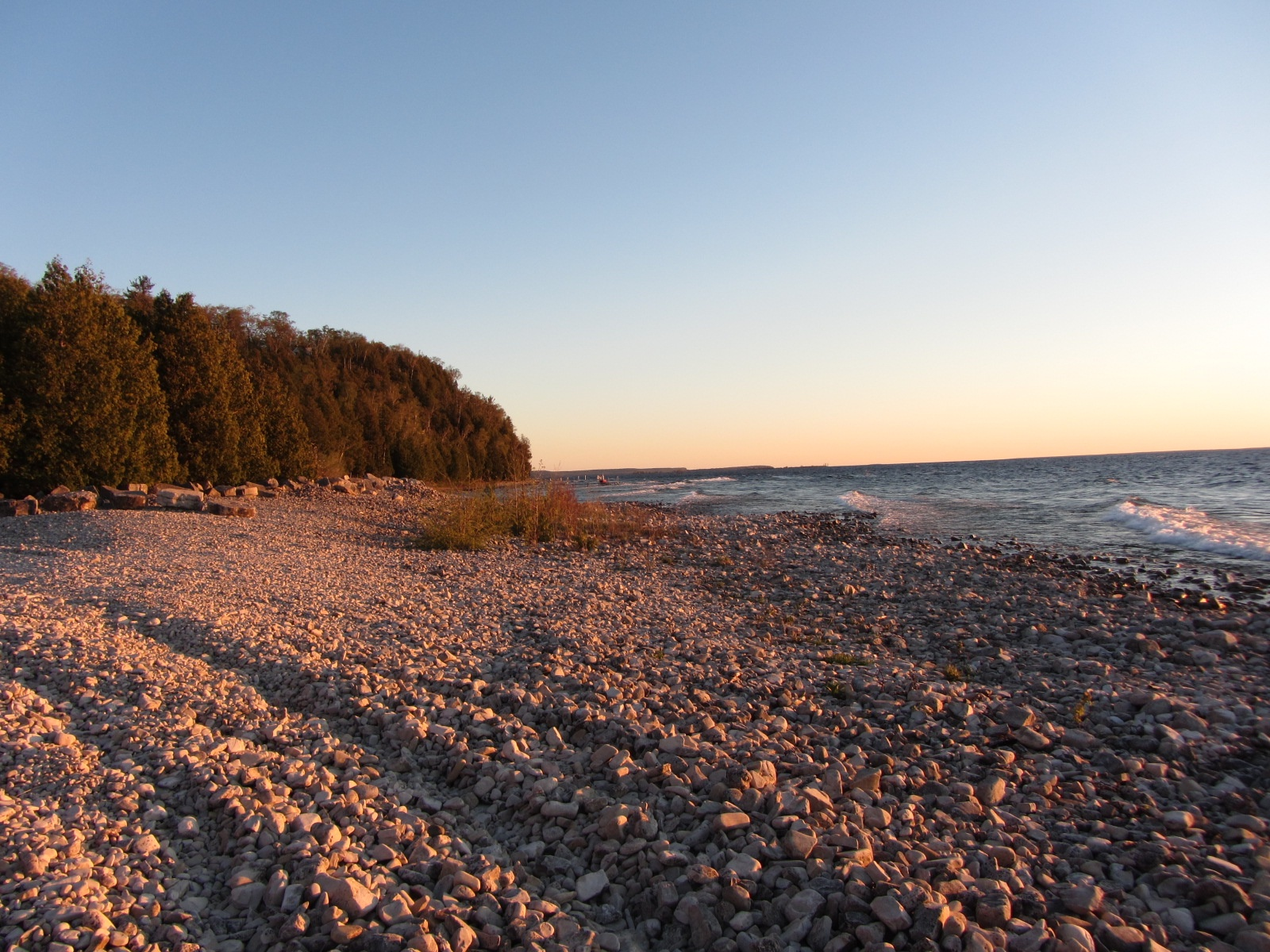
Porcupine Bay, southwestern view

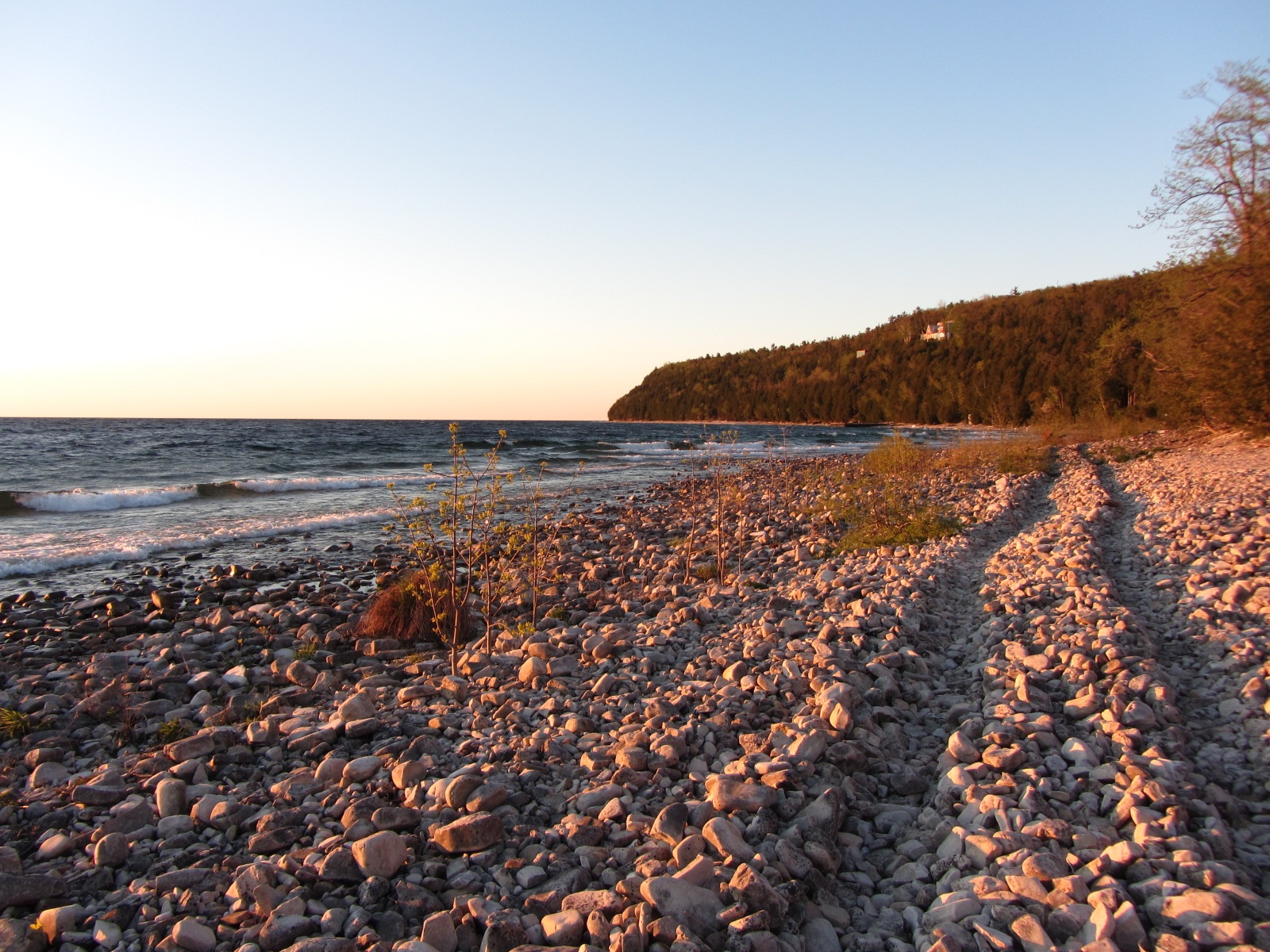
Porcupine Bay, northwestern view
