= McCardie =

McCardie is a surname. Notable people with the surname include:

- Brian McCardie (born 1965), Scottish actor and writer
- Henry McCardie (1869–1933), English judge

== See also ==
- Claire Cardie, American computer scientist
- McCurdie
- McLardie
