= Carrick Hamilton =

Scottish footballer

Personal information
- Full name: Carrick Hamilton
- Date of birth: 3 December 1881
- Place of birth: Stevenston, Scotland
- Position: Outside left

Senior career*
Years	Team	Apps	(Gls)
–1902	Ardeer Thistle		
1902	Petershill		
1902–1905	Queen's Park	13	(0)
1905–1906	Partick Thistle	20	(4)
1906–1907	Queen's Park	12	(2)
- Stevenston United
- * Club domestic league appearances and goals

Carrick Hamilton (born 1881) was a Scottish amateur footballer who played as an outside left in the Scottish League for Queen's Park and Partick Thistle.

== Career statistics ==
Appearances and goals by club, season and competition
Club	Season	League			Scottish Cup		Other		Total	
Club	Season	Division	Apps	Goals	Apps	Goals	Apps	Goals	Apps	Goals
Queen's Park	1902–03	Scottish First Division	12	0	0	0	1 (Note: Appearances in Glasgow Cup)	0	13	0
Queen's Park	1903–04	Scottish First Division	1	0	0	0	0	0	1	0
Queen's Park	Total		13	0	0	0	1	0	14	0
Partick Thistle	1905–06	Scottish First Division	20	4	1	0	0	0	21	4
Queen's Park	1905–06	Scottish First Division	0	0	—		2 (Note: Appearances Glasgow Merchants Charity Cup)	1	2	1
Queen's Park	1906–07	Scottish First Division	12	2	0	0	3	1	15	3
Queen's Park	Total		12	2	0	0	5	2	17	4
Career total			45	6	1	0	6	2	52	8
