= McLardie =

McLardie is a surname. Notable people with the surname include:

- Archibald McLardie, Scottish footballer of the 1910s and 1920s
- Archibald McLardie (footballer, born 1889) (1889–1915), Scottish footballer

== See also ==
- McCardie
- McLardy
