= Stevenston United F.C. =

Association football club in Scotland

Stevenston United
- Full name: Stevenston United Football Club
- Nickname: the United
- Founded: 1913
- Dissolved: 1922
- Ground: Warner Park
- Capacity: 12,000
- Secretary: James Innes
Home colours

Stevenston United Football Club was a football club from the town of Stevenston, Ayrshire, Scotland. The club only lasted for a decade, but once reached the quarter-finals of the Scottish Cup.

== History ==
The town of Stevenston had not had a senior football club since the demise of Stevenston Thistle F.C. in 1903. Before the start of the 1913–14 season, a number of enthusiasts in the town decided that, given the success of Ardeer Thistle F.C. in the Junior ranks, the town could once more host a senior side, and formed a new club - Stevenston United - and recruited a number of players with Scottish League experience. The new club joined the Scottish Reserve League for the season; the league featured 10 reserve teams, plus the first teams of Renton, Galston, and Dumbarton Harp. The club also entered the Scottish Cup and the Ayrshire Cup.

=== 1913–14 Scottish Cup run ===
The club's first Scottish Cup tie (the first round of the Qualifying Cup) was at home to Scottish League side Ayr United, and Stevenston pulled off a major shock by winning 1–0, in front of 4,000 at Warner Park; a win that was "quite deserved", the visitors never getting to grips with the smaller ground. A win over Galston and a bye meant the club was guaranteed a place in the first round of the Cup proper, although the club then lost to Albion Rovers in the fourth round of the Qualifying Cup.

In the competition itself, the club won 4–0 at Kirkcaldy United, the "clever and speedy" Ayrshire side's passing game more suited to the heavy conditions than the home side's attempts to dribble through the middle; two goals came from Alex McCurdie, loaned by Kilmarnock F.C. for the competition.

The club's next tie, against Peebles Rovers F.C., was overshadowed by an explosion at the Nobel Explosives Company's works in the town on 20 February, the day before the tie was to take place, in which 8 people were killed. Seven members of the United team were employed at the factory; none was injured, but the club asked the Scottish Football Association for a postponement. The SFA "reluctantly" said that it was too late to do so, and the match had to proceed. The tie therefore went ahead, with a flag at half-mast and players wearing black armbands, and United won through 3–2, having largely dominated the match but failing to take a number of chances.

The win put United into the quarter-finals, and the club was drawn to play Third Lanark at Cathkin Park. The players prepared by undertaking extra work, so that they would be "hard as nails" for the match. The club was not considered to have much of a chance - "they are fated to be snuffed out without receiving the pecuniary reward they so richly deserve...unless the heavens should fall, or some scarcely less untoward catastrophe take place, Third Lanark will surely qualify for the semi-final". However United came away with a 0–0 draw and was considered unlucky not to win.

Third Lanark offered United £300 to switch the replay to Cathkin Park, and later offered to admit all Stevenston spectators for free should it be switched. United refused, but the tie was postponed after Third Lanark's goalkeeper Jimmy Brownlie was called up to play for Scotland against Ireland the next Saturday. When the replay finally took place, United took the lead on the hour, Farrell glancing home a corner, and Hamilton struck a post; but the shock was averted when Thirds equalized with almost the last kick of the game.

The club finally went out in a second replay, at Cathkin Park, with the only goal of the game coming at the start of the second period of extra-time. The consolation for the club was that the gate share had earned the club over £400.

=== Before World War 1 ===
The club's first season in the Reserve League was fairly successful, finishing 3rd in the final table, but a late defeat to St Mirren's reserve side cost the club the title. This may have been playing on the club's mind in the Ayrshire Cup final against Galston, as the club lost 3–2, having played well below its normal standard.

The club could not repeat its national cup heroics in 1914–15; despite reaching the quarter-finals, the club did not earn an exemption from the Qualifying Tournament, and the club lost in the third qualifying round to Dykehead. However, the start of World War 1 meant the main competition did not take place.

The Ayrshire Cup nevertheless did play to a finish, and United beat Kilmarnock in the final, after a replay at Galston's Riverside Park. The club again finished 3rd in the Reserve League. However, the lack of a national Cup run had a deleterious effect on the club's finances; the club lost £100 7s 1d over the season, with income by a mammoth £911 to £364 10s 6d.

=== West of Scotland League ===
In 1915–16, the Scottish League suspended the second division, in order to save on travelling costs. Many of its members joined regional leagues instead, those in the west founding the West of Scotland League, and United was invited to join. The club more than held its own, finishing 4th in a 12 team league in 1915–16, and being runners-up to Clydebank in 1916–17. The club won every home match in the latter season, but a 4–0 defeat to Dumbarton Harp in the club's last match of the season left it 1 point short of the title. This had a consequential effect. For 1917–18, the Scottish League suspended three clubs for geographical reasons, and invited Clydebank, as West of Scotland champions, to make up the numbers; Stevenston was "first reserve" in case the Bankies turned the invitation down.

The club remained a member of the West of Scotland League, and won the title in 1919–20. The club also won - technically retaining, as it had not been played during the war - the Ayrshire Cup, beating Galston 1–0 at Rugby Park. Following such a season, United may have been considered a candidate to join the Scottish League, but the League had decided to abandon the Second Division, so the club missed out again.

This ultimately finished the club. The cost of running a side without a Scottish League place (and the guarantees for away matches, plus generally higher attendances) was proving crippling. At the close of the 1920–21 season, the club had a deficit of £130. Although a committee was formed to try to shore up the situation, and the club had a successful 1921–22 season, finishing 4th in the West of Scotland League, reaching the Ayrshire Cup final, and the first round proper of the Scottish Cup, there was no longer enough money available to keep the club going. The club did enter the Scottish Cup for 1922–23, in the hope of an attractive tie, but when drawn away at Hurlford, the club scratched. Ironically, on the demise of the West of Scotland League after the 1922–23 season, every eligible member club (except Hurlford, who also went bust at the season's end) was elected to the League.

The club has no relation to the Junior side New Stevenson United, which existed in the early 1920s.

== Colours ==
The club played in blue shirts, white shorts, and black socks.

== Grounds ==
The club played at Warner Park, whose irregular pitch was described as 'rig and fur'. The spectator area was expanded, with fresh banking, to accommodate 12,000 spectators, for the Cup quarter-final with Third Lanark.

== Notable players ==
- Carrick Hamilton, scored for the club in its 1913–14 Cup run
- Bobby Brown, half-back, loaned from Rangers for the 1913–14 season and occasionally afterwards
- David Thomson, former Port Glasgow Athletic and Everton player
- John Montgomery, goalkeeper in the 1913–14 season
