= George McHardy =

Scottish footballer

Personal information
- Place of birth: Scotland
- Position: Centre-half

Senior career*
Years	Team	Apps	(Gls)
1891–1892	Dundee Strathmore		
1892–1893	Dundee		
1893	Grimsby Town	3	(0)
- * Club domestic league appearances and goals

George McHardy was a Scottish professional footballer who played as a centre-half.
