= Philippe Lardy =

Swiss-American artist

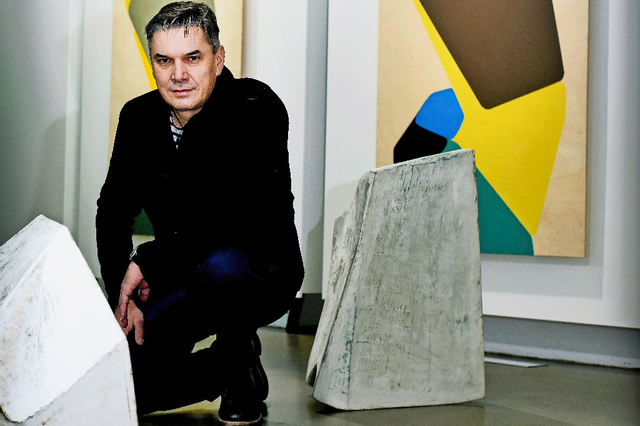
- Philippe Lardy presents Life Forms at Espace Murailles, Geneva
- Born: 1963 (age 62–63); Switzerland
- Known for: Illustrator and Painter

Philippe Lardy (born 1963) is a Swiss painter, illustrator, art director, and graphic novelist. He attended the School of Visual Arts in the 1980s.

== Career ==
Lardy started his career as a professional illustrator, contributing drawings to a number of American periodicals, publishers, and corporate clients such as The New York Times, Blue Note Records, Levis, Time, Rolling Stone, Newsweek, and The New Yorker.

In 1989, Lardy co-published Gin & Comix in collaboration with artist Jose Ortega, an anthology that showcased graphic artists from around the world.

Lardy moved to Paris in 2000 and subsequently devoted more of his time to painting. He has exhibited his work in numerous galleries in both Switzerland and France. Many of Lardy's works appear to be improvisational in nature. He has also created a series of works using entwined, twisted strips of paper that evoke the structure of DNA, a recurring image that has inspired a number of paintings, drawings, and sculptures. His work Life Forms, for example, echoes the motif of genetic recombination. In other contexts, Landy also enlarges and appropriates details from miniature models in subsequent works.

Since 2008, Lardy has served as the art director of Almanach soldes fin de séries, a French publication originally founded by the Belgian designer Marc Borgers.

Lardy is also the author of New York Chronicle, a graphic memoir that recollects his encounters with different artists he had met while living in New York City. Hypersomnia, a later graphic novel, is largely inspired by visions of the subconscious. The main character—a painter—lives through both traumatic and enlightening experiences in his search for the ultimate work of art. Lardy's cartooning style is extraordinarily detailed, echoing many of Max Klinger's pre-modernist images.

== Awards and honors ==
- Ozzie Award (2002)
- Coretta Scott King Award (2006)
- Boston Globe–Horn Book Award (2006)
- Michael L. Printz Award (2006)

== Exhibitions ==
- Art Paris Biennale (2018)
- Cosmoscow International Contemporary Art Fair (2018)
- Life Forms, Espace Muraille, Geneva (2016)
- Life Forms, Galerie Plaisirs, Paris (2012)

== Bibliography ==
- Resuscitation of a Hanged Man (1991) by Denis Johnson, ISBN 0-374-24949-0
- Passages: A Treasury of New Beginnings (1997), ISBN 978-0-7624-0150-5
- The Numerology of Birthdays by Julie Mars (1999), ISBN 0-7407-0100-2
- A Wreath for Emmett Till (2005) by Marilyn Nelson, ISBN 978-0-618-39752-5
- New York Chronicle (2009), ISBN 978-2-940376-05-6
