= Peter Cardy =

British non-governmental professional

- Born: 4 April 1947 (age 78); Gosport, England
- Other names: Peter John Stubbings Cardy, né Stubbings
- Education: Durham University
- Occupation: non-governmantal professional
- Known for: argued energetically for the interests of people affected by cancer
- Spouse: Christine Mary Cardy (m. 1987; div. 2011)
- Awards: Charcot Medal of the Association of British Neurologists

Peter John Stubbings Cardy (né Stubbings; born 4 April 1947) is a former professional in the non-governmental sector in the United Kingdom.

== Personal ==
Cardy was born in Gosport and studied at Durham University, graduating in 1968 with a BA. He married Christine Mary Cardy in 1987, each adopting the other's surname. They divorced in 2011.

== Career ==
On graduating he worked first in adult education in Cambridgeshire, then for the Workers Education Association in the North of Scotland. Until 1987 he was deputy director of the National Volunteer Centre,. He became CEO of the Motor Neurone Disease Association, then in 1994 CEO of the Multiple Sclerosis Society, before joining Macmillan Cancer Support (then Macmillan Cancer Relief) as CEO in 2001. In a change of direction he was appointed CEO of the UK Maritime and Coastguard Agency, part of the Department of Transport at a time of turbulent industrial relations. His final full-time job was as CEO of Sail Training International, organisers of The Tall Ships Races. He retried in 2013.

Cardy's style was frequently combative; he published articles in journals and books * critical of the ambivalence of successive governments towards volunteers. At the MS Society he led a vigorous campaign to persuade the UK departments of health to fund drugs for the disease, including advertisements in the broadsheets press in 2000 lampooning ministers' reluctance. 'Cardy's reputation was that of a hard hitter, and not always a subtle one, for the interests of the patients and careers'. ** At Macmillan he argued energetically for the interests of people affected by cancer broadly, widening the charitable established focus beyond nurses and doctors, reshaping its services and changing its identity and brand accordingly.

== Writing ==
Cardy wrote for professional journals in each of his roles, and sometimes about the transitions. In Practical Neurology he wrote about his move from neurological diseases to cancer, contrasting the huge investment in cancer research and the treatment with the impoverished state of neurology care and research*. From 2005 to 2007 he wrote an opinion column for the journal Third Sector ***, resuming with an agony column from 2014 to 2020. During the break he wrote critically about highs and lows of returning to the voluntary sector after a period in the Civil Service**. He was profiled in the Lancet****, shipping journals Fairplay***** and Loyd's List****** and has written for the Marine Quarterly******* and the Nautical Institute Journal Seaways********.

== Other ==
Among many other roles, between 1998 and 2008 he was a Medicines Commissioner, chaired the Neurological Alliance, the Lung Cancer Group of the National Cancer Research Institute, and the Brain and Spine Foundation. He was a member and later chair of the Government Affairs Committee of the Royal Yachting Association between 2010 and 2019 and a governor of Solent University from 2011 to 2017. After relocating to Gosport he became secretary until 2019 of the marine business network, now called Portsmouth Harbour Marine; he was active in the Gosport Town Team and Coastal Communities Team. In 2019 he was appointed a trustee of Hampshire Cultural Trust.

== Awards ==
In 2002 he was awarded the Charcot Medal of the Association of British Neurologists. Few of these awards had been made up to this point and all had been to physicians. He was made a Companion of the Nautical Institute in 2009, and in 2010 a member of the Honourable Company of Master Mariners.
