= Rowleys Bay, Wisconsin =

- unincorporated community
- Location within the state of Wisconsin
- Coordinates: 45°13′11″N 87°02′07″W
- Country: United States
- State: Wisconsin
- County: Door
- Town: Liberty Grove
- Time zone: UTC-6 (Central (CST))
  - Summer (DST): UTC-5 (CDT)
- Area code: 920
- GNIS feature ID: 1572692

Rowleys Bay (/ˈroʊliz ˈbeɪ/ ROH-leez BAY) is an unincorporated community located on Lake Michigan in northern Door County, Wisconsin, United States, in the town of Liberty Grove. The community is named after Peter Rowley, who settled in the area in 1835.

== Gallery ==
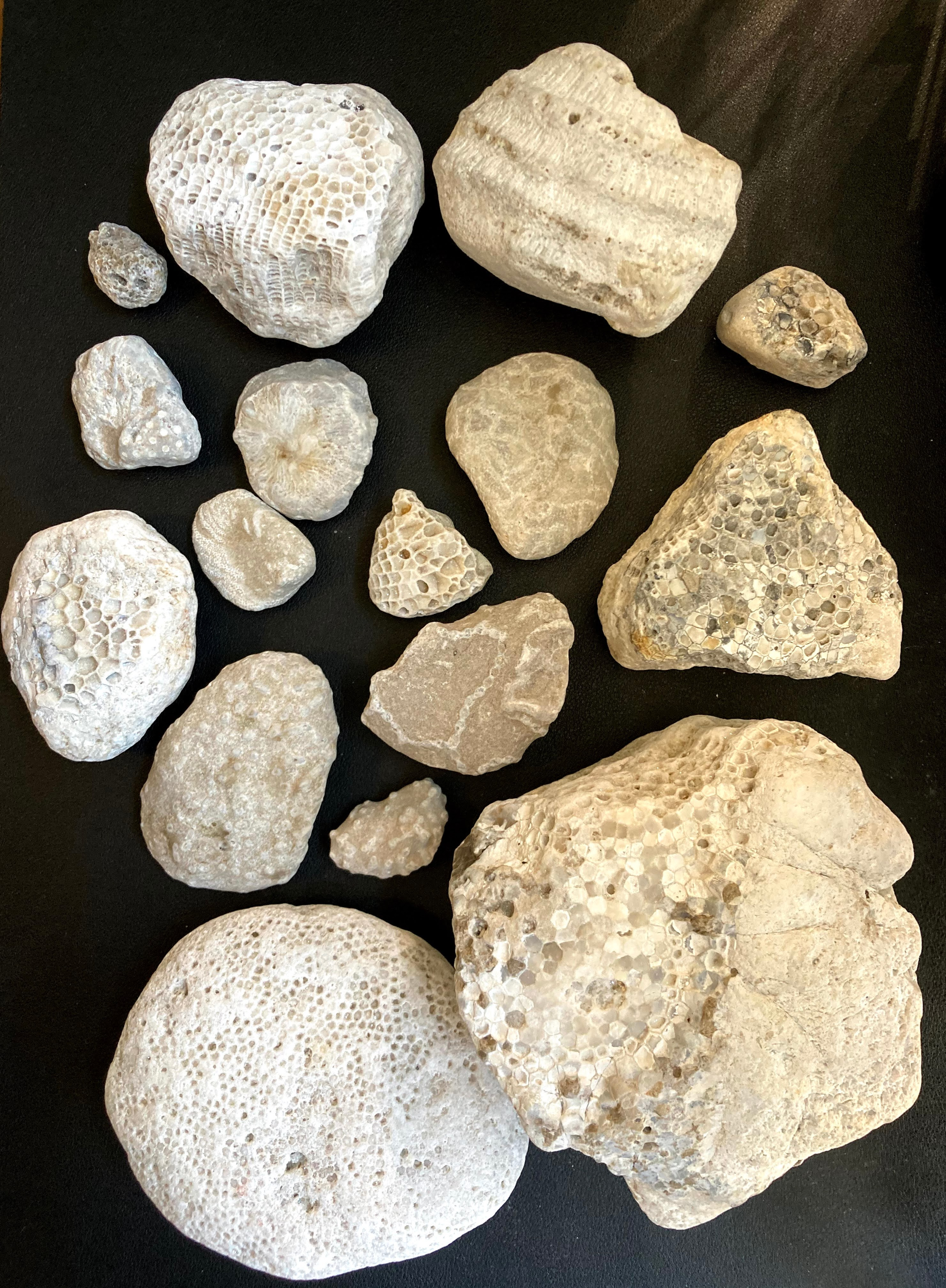
Fossil corals from Rowleys Bay, including those from the genera Favosites and Halysites.

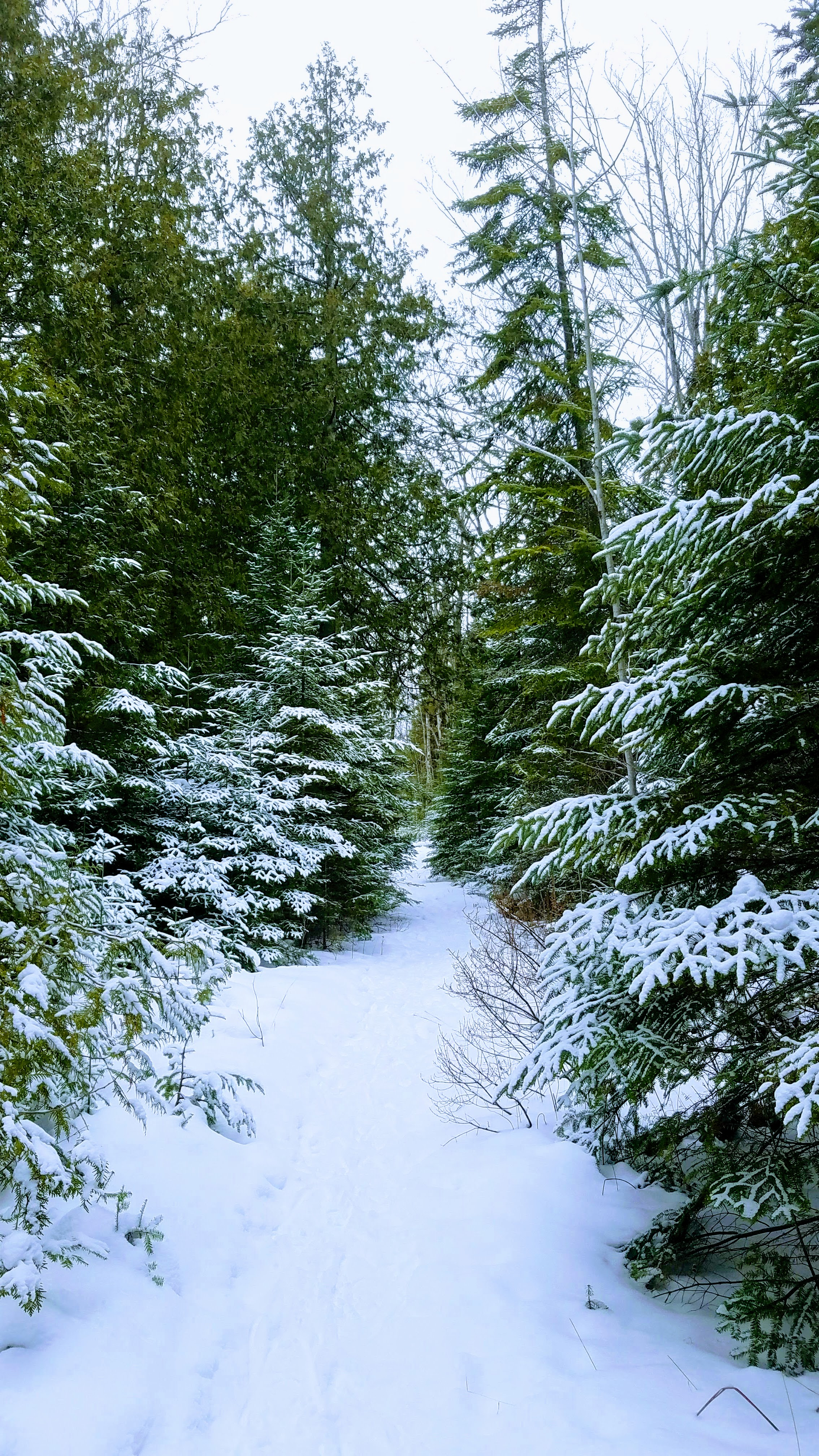
A trail at a resort near Rowleys Bay
