= Cardy Site =

- U.S. National Register of Historic Places
- Location: 322 W. Spruce Street, Sturgeon Bay, Wisconsin
- NRHP reference No.: 10000197
- Added to NRHP: April 19, 2010

The Cardy Site in Sturgeon Bay, Wisconsin is a Paleo-Indian campsite, and the oldest known archaeology site on the Door Peninsula. It was added to the National Register of Historic Places in 2010.

== History ==
Around 11,000 years ago, just at the end of the last ice age, migrating Paleo-Indian hunters camped at this site, probably following large game in the tundra-like zone near the retreating glacier. At this location they chipped chert brought from as far as Moline, Illinois into fluted points and other tools.

In 1878 the Cardy family began farming that spot, and began turning up chipped stone implements. In the 1950s a young Daniel Cardy, studying at UW-Madison, realized that the points the family found looked like Clovis points. Archaeologists at Madison told him this was unlikely, since Door County was still covered by an ice sheet at the time of the Clovis culture. In 2003 archaeologists excavated sample pits the Cardy property, turning up more chipped stone tools and discarded flakes. The tools had Gainey points, closely related to Clovis, placing their creation around 9000 BCE.

As the city of Sturgeon Bay expanded, part of the site was developed and due to the disturbance of the soil is no longer considered useful for archeological research. The remaining, undeveloped portion of the site was protected by the Cardy family beginning in 1960, added to the Wisconsin State Register of Historic Places in 2009, and today belongs to The Archaeological Conservancy. It is open to the public and listed as a point of interest near the Ice Age Trail.
