= McLarty =

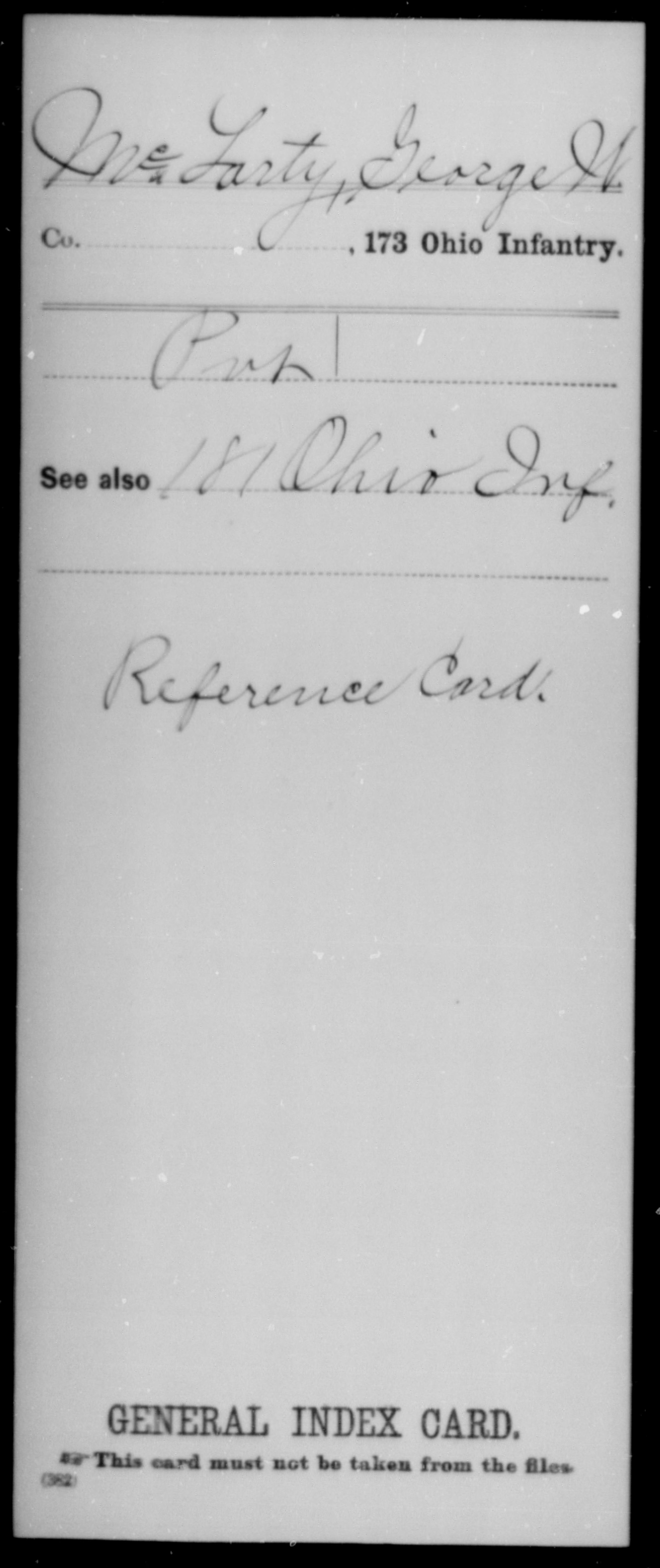
Infantry reference card

McLarty is a surname of Scottish origin. People with the name include:

- Colin McLarty (born 1951), American mathematician
- Edward McLarty (1848–1917), Australian politician
- Gary McLarty (1940–2014), American stuntman
- Hector Neil McLarty (1851–1912), Australian policeman and explorer
- Jack McLarty (1919–2011), American painter
- John McLarty (1842–1909), Australian politician
- Mack McLarty (born 1946), American politician
- Nell McLarty (1912–1998), Australian cricketer
- Norman Alexander McLarty (1889–1945), Canadian politician
- Ron McLarty (1947–2020), American actor and novelist
- Ross McLarty (1891–1962), Australian politician

== See also ==
- Lake McLarty, a lake in Western Australia
- McLarty Treasure Museum, a museum in Florida
