= Alex McCurdie =

Scottish footballer

Personal information
- Full name: Alexander McCurdie
- Date of birth: 7 January 1895
- Place of birth: Trabboch, Scotland
- Date of death: 24 April 1917 (aged 22)
- Place of death: Beaucamp, France
- Position: Centre forward

Senior career*
Years	Team	Apps	(Gls)
–1913	Glasgow University		
1913–1915	Kilmarnock	11	(2)
- → Stevenston United (loan)
1915	→ Reading (guest)	1	(0)
- * Club domestic league appearances and goals

Alexander McCurdie (7 January 1895 – 24 April 1917) was a Scottish professional footballer who played as a centre forward in the Scottish League for Kilmarnock.

== Personal life ==
McCurdie attended Glasgow University. In May 1915, 9 months after Britain's entry into the First World War, McCurdie enlisted in the Argyll and Sutherland Highlanders. He arrived on the Western Front in June 1916 and saw action at the Battle of the Ancre five months later. By April 1917, he had been promoted to acting lance-sergeant and had been recommended for the DCM. McCurdie was killed while on patrol in Beaucamps, Nord on 24 April 1917 and he was buried in Fifteen Ravine British Cemetery, Villers-Plouich.

== Career statistics ==
Appearances and goals by club, season and competition
Club	Season	League			National Cup		Total	
Club	Season	Division	Apps	Goals	Apps	Goals	Apps	Goals
Kilmarnock	1913–14	Scottish First Division	5	2	0	0	5	2
Kilmarnock	1914–15	Scottish First Division	6	0	0	0	6	0
Career total			11	2	0	0	11	2
