= McCurdie =

McCurdie is a surname. Notable people with the surname include:

- Alex McCurdie (1895–1917), Scottish footballer
- Carolyn McCurdie, British-born New Zealand author
