= North Bay, Door County, Wisconsin =

North Bay, Wisconsin
- Unincorporated community
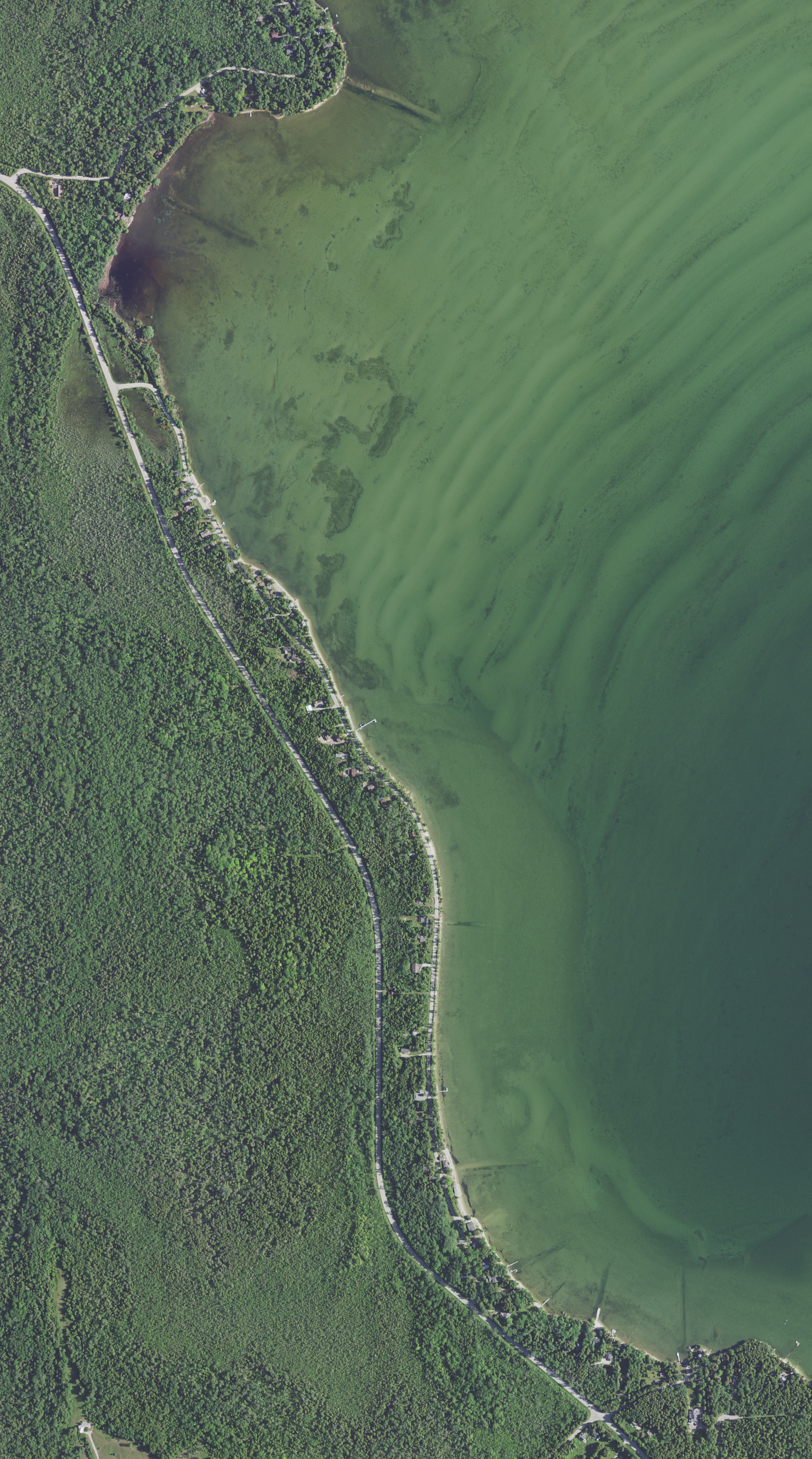
- Aerial view of the community of North Bay and residential developments to the south

- Location within the state of Wisconsin
- Coordinates: 45°08′46″N 87°04′58″W
- Country: United States
- State: Wisconsin
- County: Door
- Town: Liberty Grove
- Time zone: UTC-6 (Central (CST))
  - Summer (DST): UTC-5 (CDT)
- Area code: 920
- GNIS feature ID: 1570354

North Bay is a small Unincorporated community located on Lake Michigan in the town of Liberty Grove in northern Door County, Wisconsin, United States. The North Bay State Natural Area along with a few resorts are located within the vicinity of the community. A Native American name for North Bay is "Wah-Sa-Ke-Ta-Ta-Wong", or "Burning Island".

== Climate ==
North Bay

Climate chart (precipitation, max. and min. temperature)
J	F	M	A	M	J	J	A	S	O	N	D
63 −4 −5	52 −6 −8	49 0 −3	97 3 1	86 7 3	91 14 9	105 15 14	96 18 17	96 16 15	107 10 6	80 4 4	57 3 −2
- █ Average max. and min. temperatures in °C
- █ Precipitation totals in mm
Imperial conversion
J	F	M	A	M	J	J	A	S	O	N	D
2.5 25 23	2 21 18	1.9 32 27	3.8 37 34	3.4 45 37	3.6 57 48	4.1 59 57	3.8 64 63	3.8 61 59	4.2 50 43	3.1 39 39	2.2 37 28
- █ Average max. and min. temperatures in °F
- █ Precipitation totals in inches

== Photo of North Bay State Natural Area ==
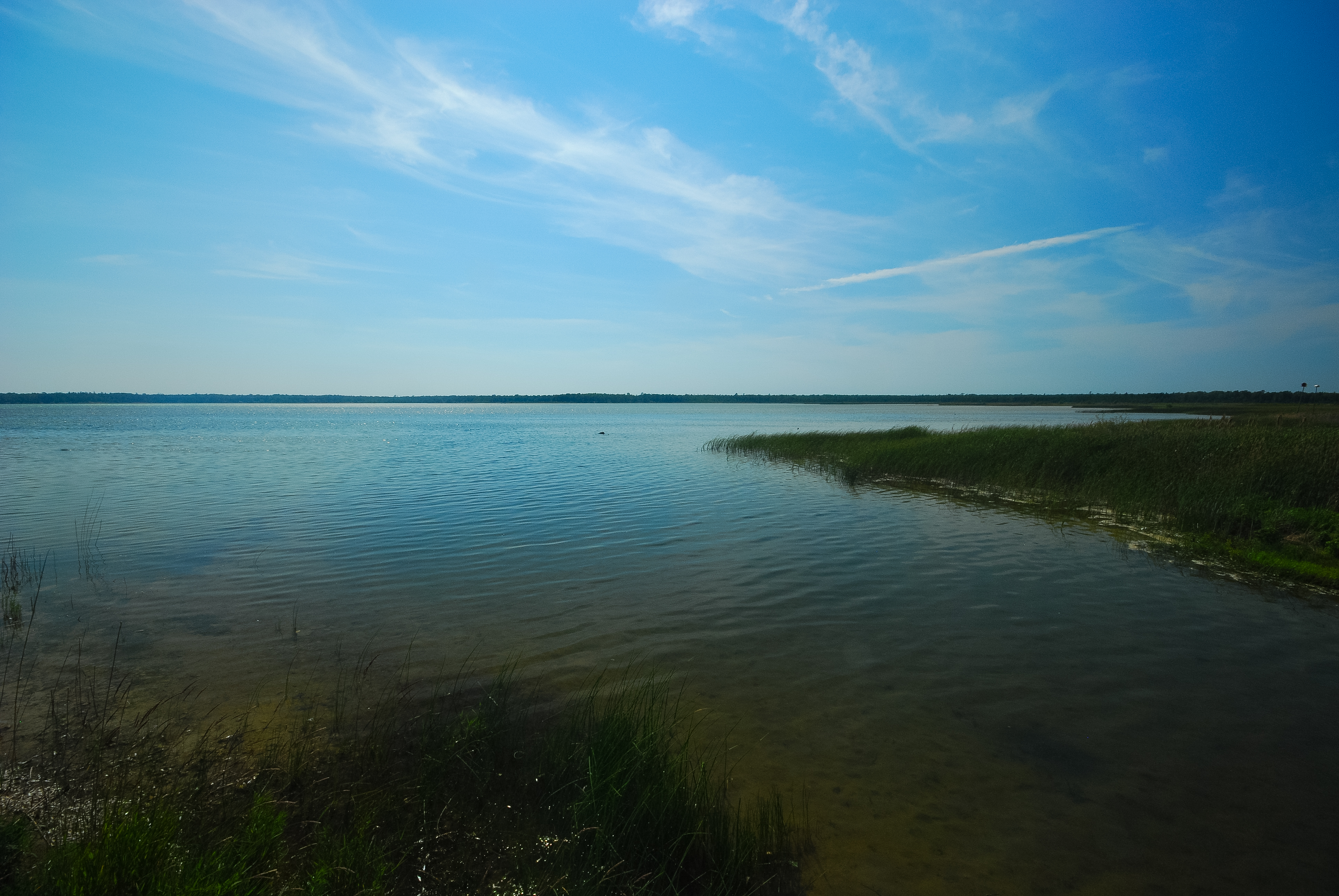
North Bay State Natural Area
