= Fiona McHardy =

English classical scholar

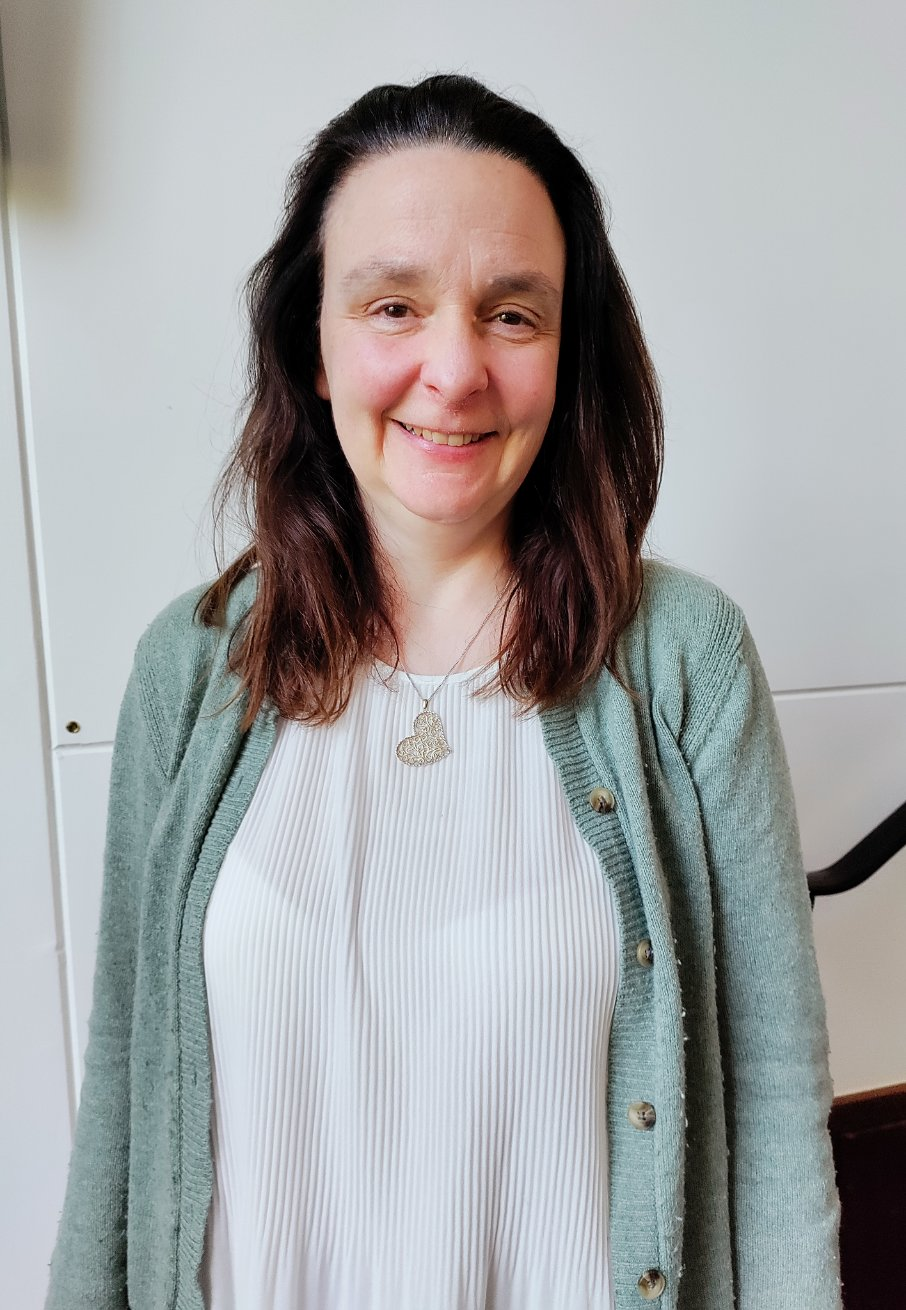
Professor Fiona McHardy, Classical Association Conference, University of Cambridge, April 2023

Fiona McHardy is a professor of Classics and also the Head of History and Classics in the School of Humanities and Social Sciences at the University of Roehampton. In 2003 she started work at Roehampton where she was responsible for building up the BA Classical Civilisation. Her research interests include ancient and modern Greek literature, folk poetry, anthropology and culture. She teaches modules on ancient Greek language, literature and culture.

== Career ==
McHardy completed her PhD at the University of Exeter in 1999. Her thesis was titled ‘The ideology of revenge in ancient Greek culture: a study of ancient Athenian revenge ethics’; and she is the author of Revenge in Athenian Culture (Bloomsbury, 2008).

She is an editor with Nancy Sorkin Rabinowitz and Mark Masterson for the series Intersectionality in Classical Antiquity (Edinburgh University Press), which focuses on 'intersectional approaches to sexuality and gender in Greco-Roman Antiquity...with a range of other factors including race, ethnicity, class, ability, masculinity, femininity, transgender and post-colonial gender studies'.

She is currently writing a book on Gender Violence in Ancient Greece, covering such topics as infanticide, sexual violence, uxoricide and domestic violence. She is a co-editor for Classics in and Out of the Academy: Classical Pedagogy in the Twenty-First Century, for Routledge.

In 2017, McHardy co-organised an event with Susan Deacy and Katerina Volioti for the Women's Classical Committee UK on 'Bullying and Harassment in UK Classics Departments: Finding Solutions'.

McHardy's inaugural professorial lecture, entitled 'Ancient Greek Tiger Mothers', was held on October 8, 2018, at the University of Roehampton.

== Selected publications ==
McHardy is the author of Revenge in Athenian Culture (Bloomsbury, 2008); and has co-edited the following five volumes:

- Women's Influence on Classical Civilization (Routledge, 2004).
- Lost Dramas of Classical Athens (Exeter, 2005).
- From Abortion to Pederasty: Addressing Difficulty Topics in the Classics Classroom (Ohio, 2014).
- Revenge and Gender from Classical to Renaissance Literature (Edinburgh, 2018).
- Diversity and the Study of Antiquity in Higher Education: Perspectives from North America and Europe (Routledge, 2023).
