= Cardi =

Cardi is an Italian surname. Notable people with the surname include:

- Beatrice de Cardi (1914–2016), British archaeologist
- Lodovico Cardi (1559–1613), Italian painter and architect better known as Cigoli
- Ezio Cardi (born 1948), Italian cyclist

Notable people with the name include:

- Cardi B, American rapper

== See also ==
- Cardy (surname)
- Cardigan (sweater)
- Bacardi
