= Gills Rock, Wisconsin =

- Unincorporated community
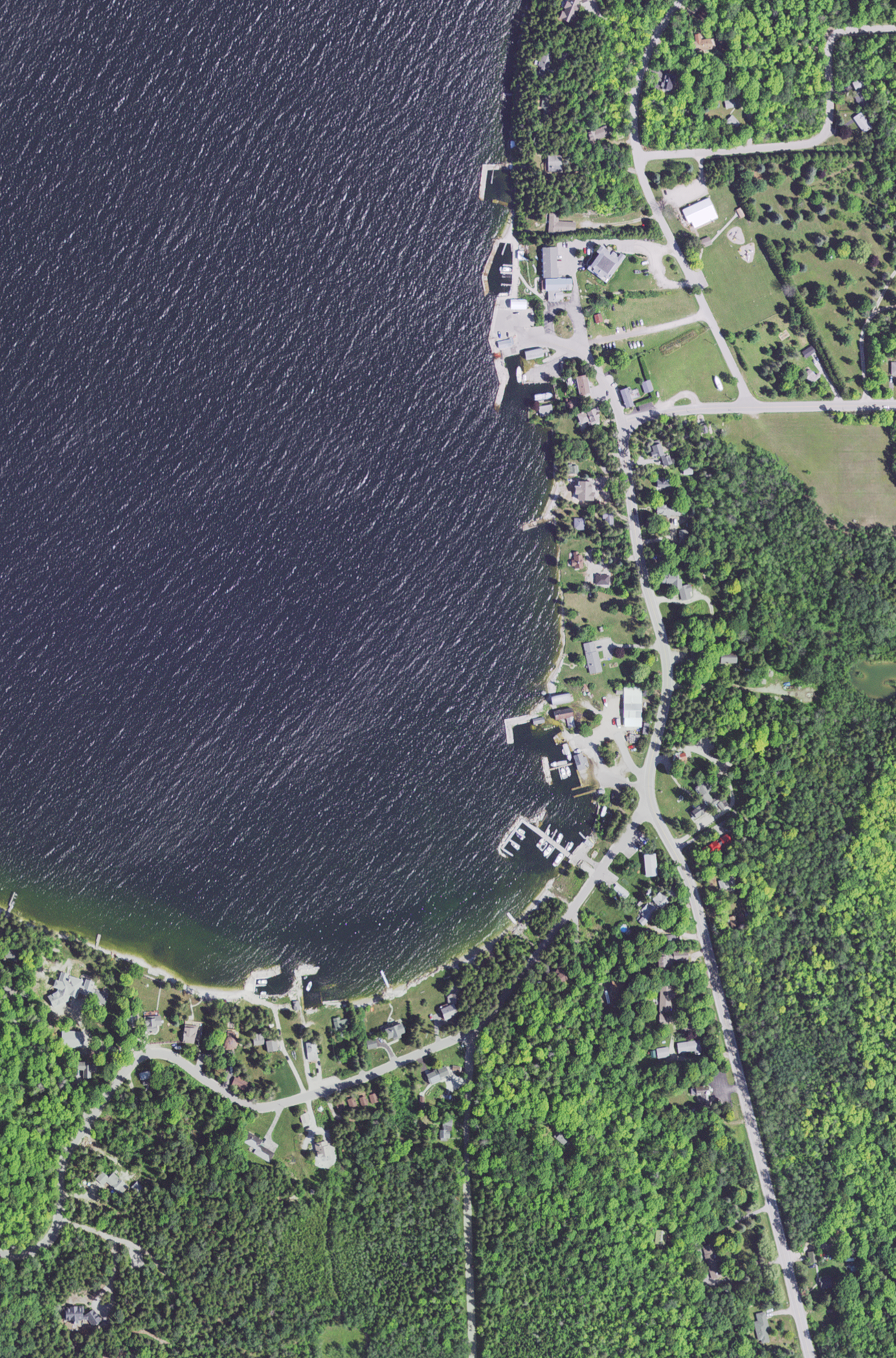
- Aerial view in 2020

- Location within the state of Wisconsin
- Coordinates: 45°17′24″N 87°01′18″W
- Country: United States
- State: Wisconsin
- County: Door
- Town: Liberty Grove
- Time zone: UTC-6 (Central (CST))
  - Summer (DST): UTC-5 (CDT)
- Area code: 920

Gills Rock is an unincorporated community located on Highway 42 at the northern tip of the Door Peninsula in Door County, Wisconsin, United States. It is within the town of Liberty Grove and was formerly known as Hedgehog Harbor.

== History ==
This area is known to the Potawatomi as Wah-ya-qua-kah-me-kong, for "head of the land" or "land's end". Today the area is named for Elias Gill, a local 19th century landowner.

Gills Rock has a strong history and tradition of commercial fishing, which continues to this day. Death's Door Maritime Museum is located there. The area is also popular with scuba divers who explore the many shipwrecks in and around Death's Door, the narrow strait connecting Lake Michigan to Green Bay, also known as Porte des Morts. The Pilot Island Light is located on Pilot Island near Gills Rock.

Gills Rock is also the departure point of a passenger ferry to Washington Island. The vehicle ferry to Washington Island departs 2.25 miles (3.5 km) to the east, in Northport.

== In popular culture ==
The town is the birthplace of fictional character Gwen Raiden from the TV series Angel.

== Education ==
Gibraltar Area Schools serves the community. Gibraltar Elementary School and Gibraltar Secondary School are the two schools.

== Climate ==
Table Bluff (At the northern tip of the Gills Rock area)

Climate chart (precipitation, max. and min. temperature)
J	F	M	A	M	J	J	A	S	O	N	D
66 −4 −9	60 −8 −10	62 0 −4	112 3 0	86 9 3	77 13 10	96 18 16	73 19 16	109 17 14	119 10 7	110 6 5	66 4 1
- █ Average max. and min. temperatures in °C
- █ Precipitation totals in mm
Imperial conversion
J	F	M	A	M	J	J	A	S	O	N	D
2.6 25 16	2.4 18 14	2.4 32 25	4.4 37 32	3.4 48 37	3 55 50	3.8 64 61	2.9 66 61	4.3 63 57	4.7 50 45	4.3 43 41	2.6 39 34
- █ Average max. and min. temperatures in °F
- █ Precipitation totals in inches

== Images ==
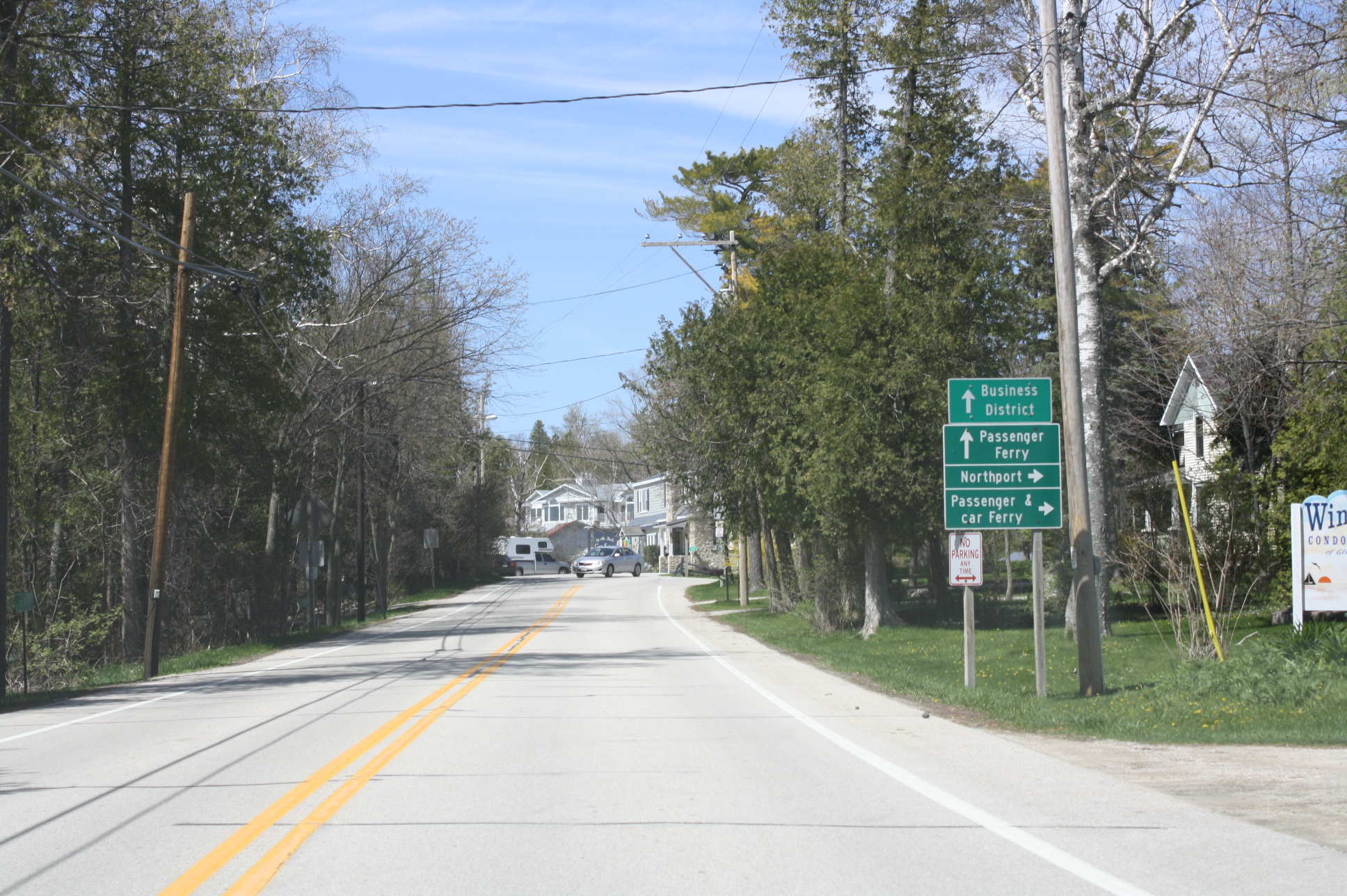
Looking north at downtown Gills Rock

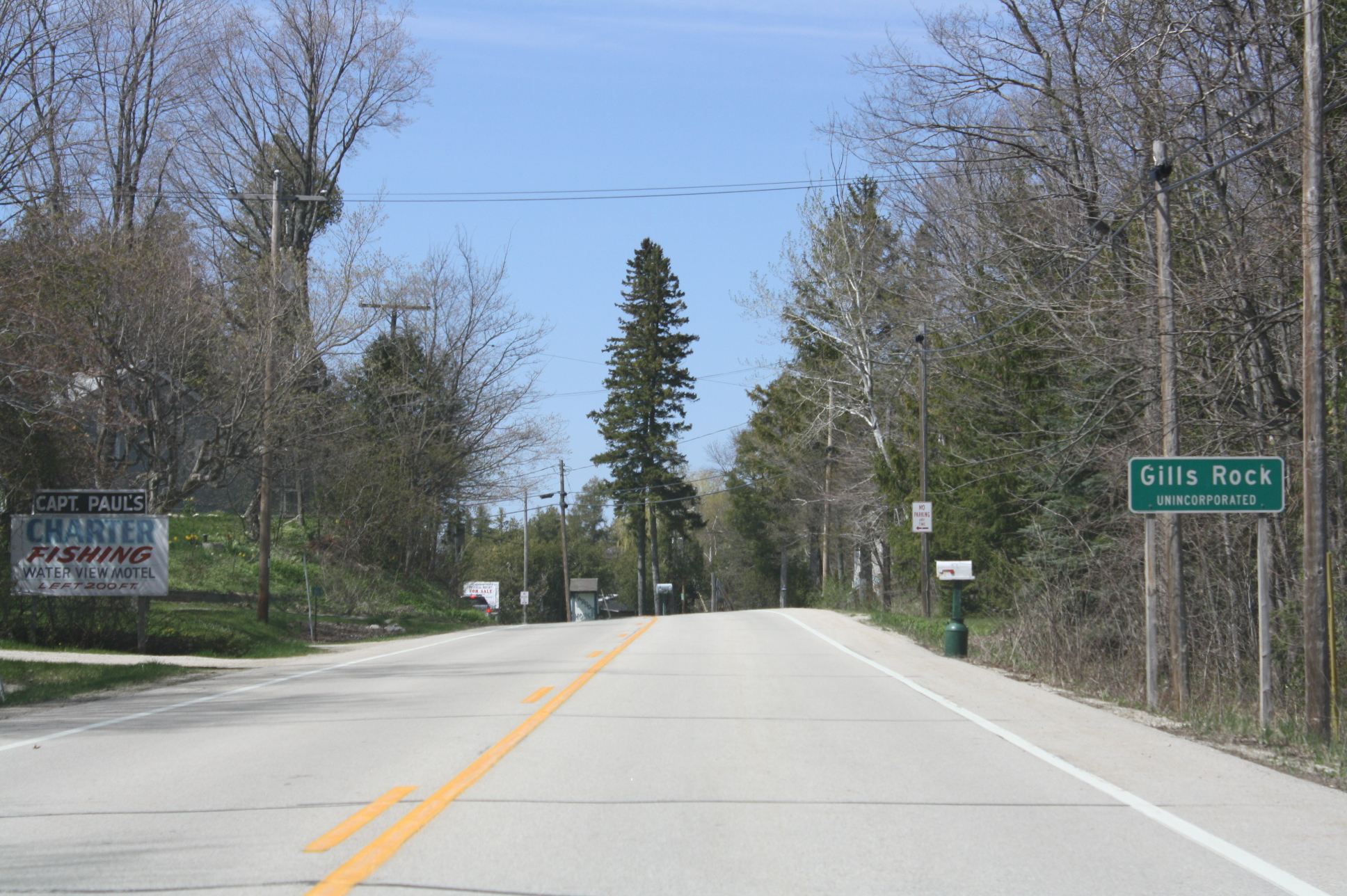
Sign on Wisconsin Highway 42

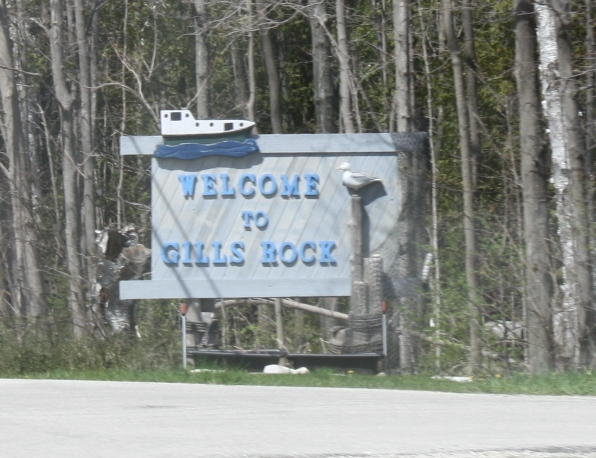
Welcome sign

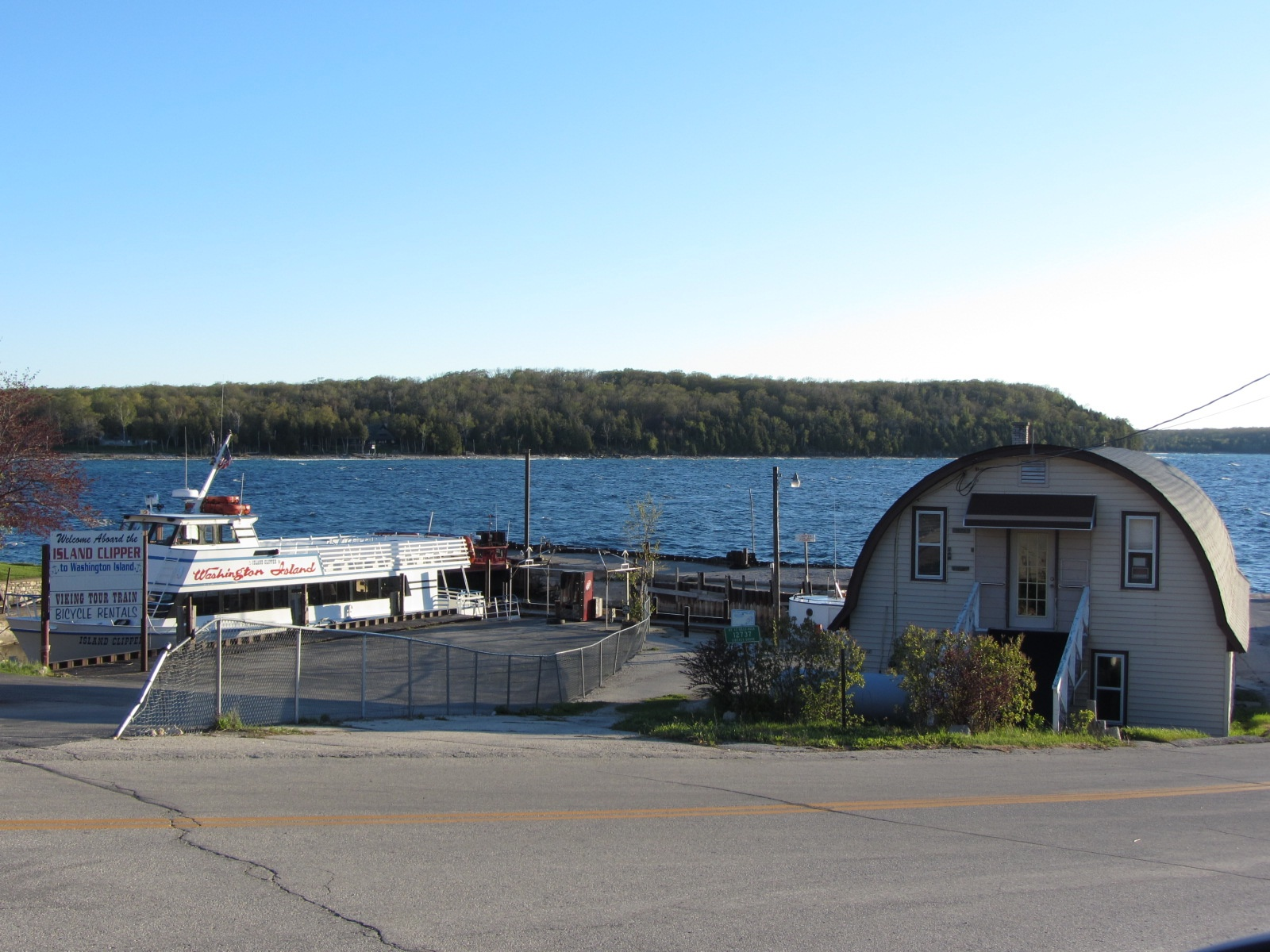
Island Clipper ferry

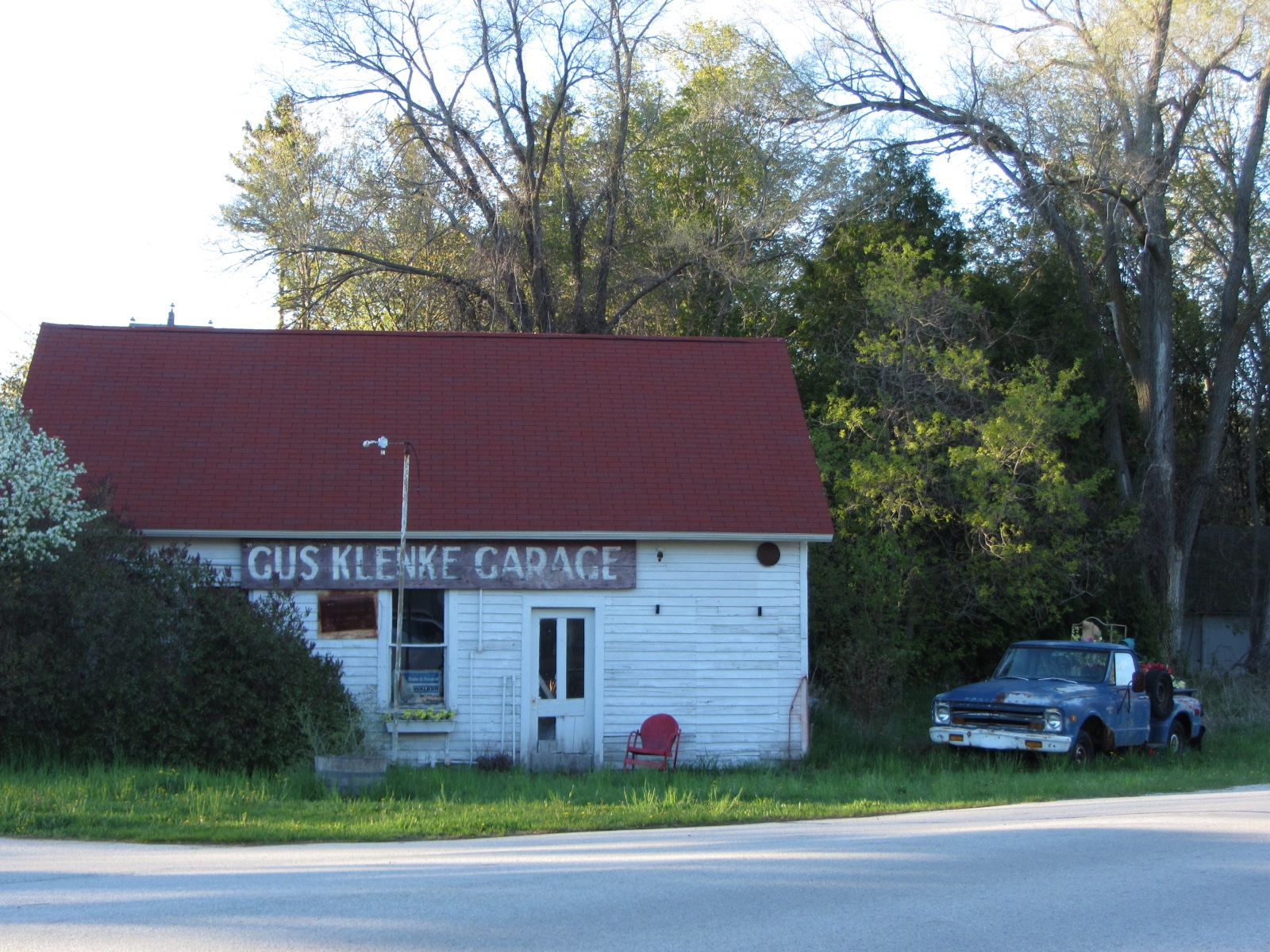
Gus Klenke's garage

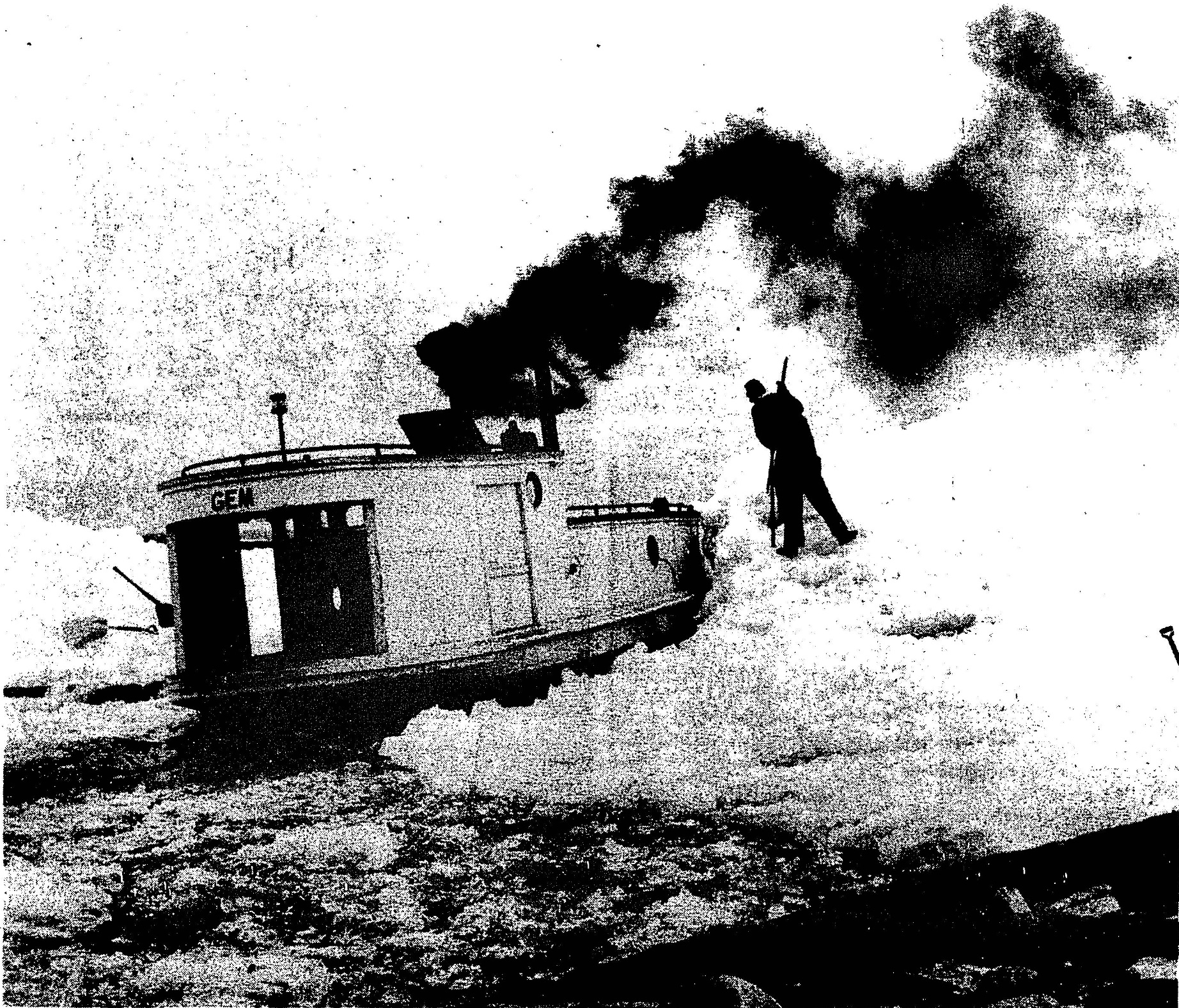
Fish tug Gem near Gills Rock, photo taken March 1973

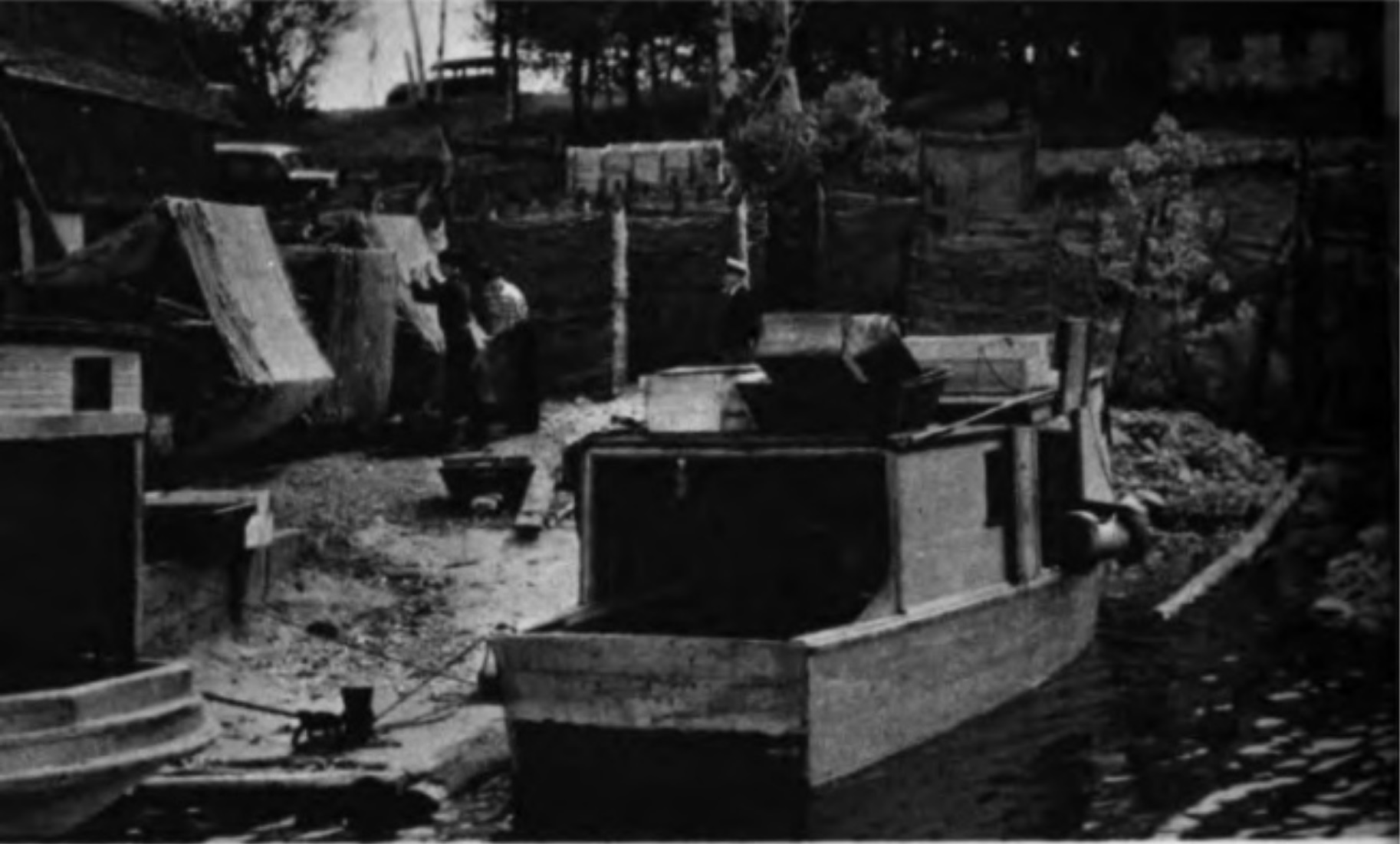
Fishing village at Gills Rock, published 1941
