= Wisconsin Highway 42 =

Highway in Wisconsin

State Trunk Highway 42
- WIS 42; mainline in red, business route in blue

Route information
- Maintained by WisDOT
- Length: 135 mi (217 km)
- Tourist routes: Lake Michigan Circle Tour

Major junctions
- South end: WIS 23 / WIS 28 in Sheboygan
- I-43 near Sheboygan; WIS 32 in Howards Grove; US 151 in Manitowoc; I-43 / US 151 in Manitowoc; US 10 in Manitowoc; WIS 57 around Sturgeon Bay
- North end: Washington Island Ferry Dock in Northport

Location
- Country: United States
- State: Wisconsin
- Counties: Sheboygan, Manitowoc, Kewaunee, Door

Highway system
- Wisconsin State Trunk Highway System; Interstate; US; State; Scenic; Rustic
← WIS 41	→ I-43

State Trunk Highway 42 (often called Highway 42, STH-42 or WIS 42) is a state highway in the U.S. state of Wisconsin. It runs for 135 miles (217 km) north–south in northeast Wisconsin from Sheboygan to the ferry dock in Northport. Much of the highway is part of the Lake Michigan Circle Tour from the eastern junction with U.S. Highway 10 (US 10) in Manitowoc to its junction with WIS 57 in Sister Bay. WIS 42 parallels I-43 from Sheboygan to Manitowoc, and parallels WIS 57 throughout much of the route, particularly from Manitowoc to Sturgeon Bay, meeting the northern terminus of WIS 57 in Sister Bay.

== Route description ==
=== Sheboygan to Manitowoc ===
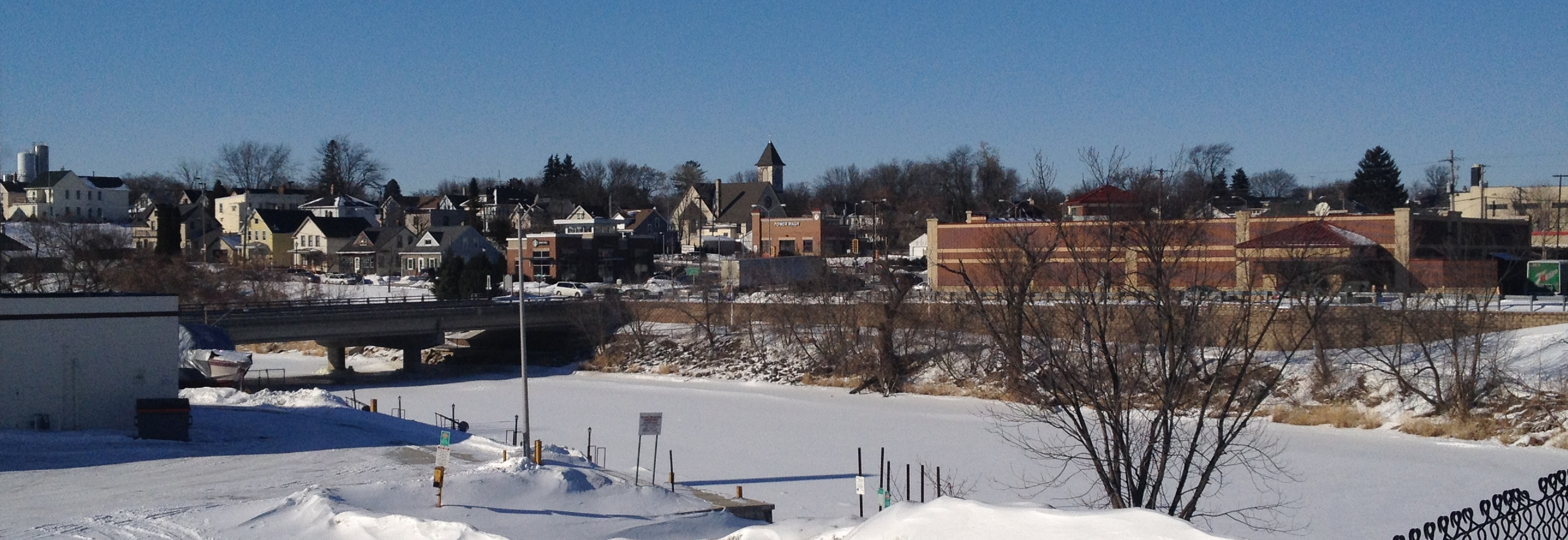
The three-highway terminus in Sheboygan featuring WIS 42 going northward

WIS 42 begins at the intersection of North 14th Street and Erie Avenue (also known as Kohler Memorial Drive) in downtown Sheboygan, a block north of the bridge crossing the Sheboygan River. The intersection is the terminus of two other state highways, WIS 23 and WIS 28.

WIS 42 follows North 14th Street to Calumet Drive, which heads out of the city in a northwesterly direction to its interchange with Interstate 43 (I-43) at exit 128 which has four roundabouts within a mile; two controlling freeway access, a retail development with Walmart and Menards at Vanguard Drive, and then CTH-Y. The route continues to the northwest into the city of Howards Grove past Howards Grove High School, where it becomes Madison Avenue. Because there are only two exits in the 20 miles (32 km) between WIS 42's junctions with I-43 in Sheboygan and Manitowoc, it also serves as the state-designated Alternate I-43 (along with the roads from those two exits from WIS 42) when road incidents close I-43 proper.

At the intersection of Madison Avenue and South Wisconsin Drive, WIS 42 and WIS 32 meet. WIS 32 continues to the northwest on Madison Avenue, while WIS 42 turns north on Wisconsin Drive. WIS 42 continues north out of Howards Grove into Manitowoc County. While in southern Manitowoc County, WIS 42 intersects County Trunk Highway XX (CTH-XX), which leads east to I-43 and Cleveland, carrying it for about a mile before CTH-XX heads west towards Kiel in the community of Meeme. It intersects with CTH-C in the town of Newton, also leading east to I-43 while west towards St. Nazianz.

=== Manitowoc to Sturgeon Bay ===
WIS 42 continues to the north towards the city of Manitowoc, where it intersects US 151 (Calumet Avenue) just west of I-43. Turning east, WIS 42 runs concurrently with US 151 for about a quarter mile (0.4 km) before US 151 ends at I-43. WIS 42 then travels on Calumet Avenue into Manitowoc's business district where it intersects with US 10 twice before leaving US 10 and turning east onto Waldo Boulevard for Lake Michigan and Two Rivers. Prior to 2022, WIS 42 turned north onto I-43 at I-43 Exit 149 for Calumet Avenue and exited the interstate with US 10 onto Waldo Boulevard.

Crossing the West Twin River near its confluence with the East Twin River just south of downtown Two Rivers, WIS 42 becomes Washington Street. Two blocks north, it meets the eastern terminus of WIS 310 at 16th Street. Six blocks north, it meets the eastern terminus of WIS 147 at 22nd Street.

WIS 42 turns to the east on 22nd Street and crosses over the East Twin River, then turns north on Lincoln Avenue. WIS 42 and WIS 147 are the only two state highways that cross both branches of the Twin Rivers, though WIS 147 does not cross the West Twin River until about a mile east of its terminus with I-43 near Maribel.

WIS 42 continues to the north, running roughly parallel to the Lake Michigan shoreline into Kewaunee County. Just south of the city of Kewaunee, WIS 42 turns east on Krok Road to Lakeshore Drive, where it turns north and heads into the city as Milwaukee Street. In downtown Kewaunee, WIS 42 meets the eastern terminus of another state highway, WIS 29. WIS 42 becomes Main Street after crossing the Kewaunee River and continues north out of the city.

In the unincorporated town of Alaska, WIS 42 again turns east towards Lake Michigan to follow the shoreline into Algoma as Lake Street. In downtown Algoma, WIS 42 turns north onto 4th Street and crosses the Ahnapee River. On the north bank of the river, WIS 42 turns northwest onto North Water Street and follows the river in a northerly direction to Forestville in Door County, where it becomes Forestville Avenue.

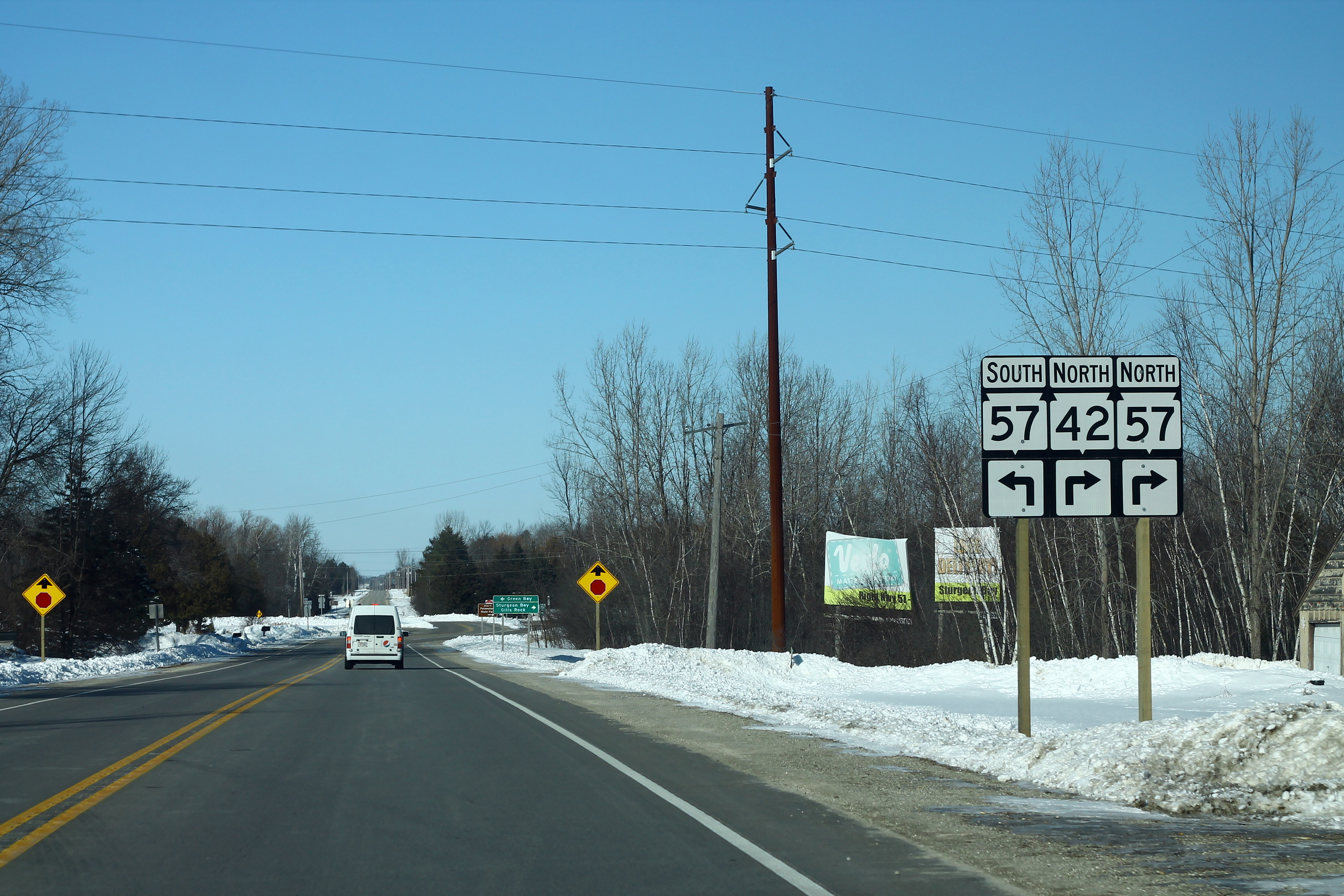
Sign for the junction of WIS 42 and WIS 57 south of Sturgeon Bay

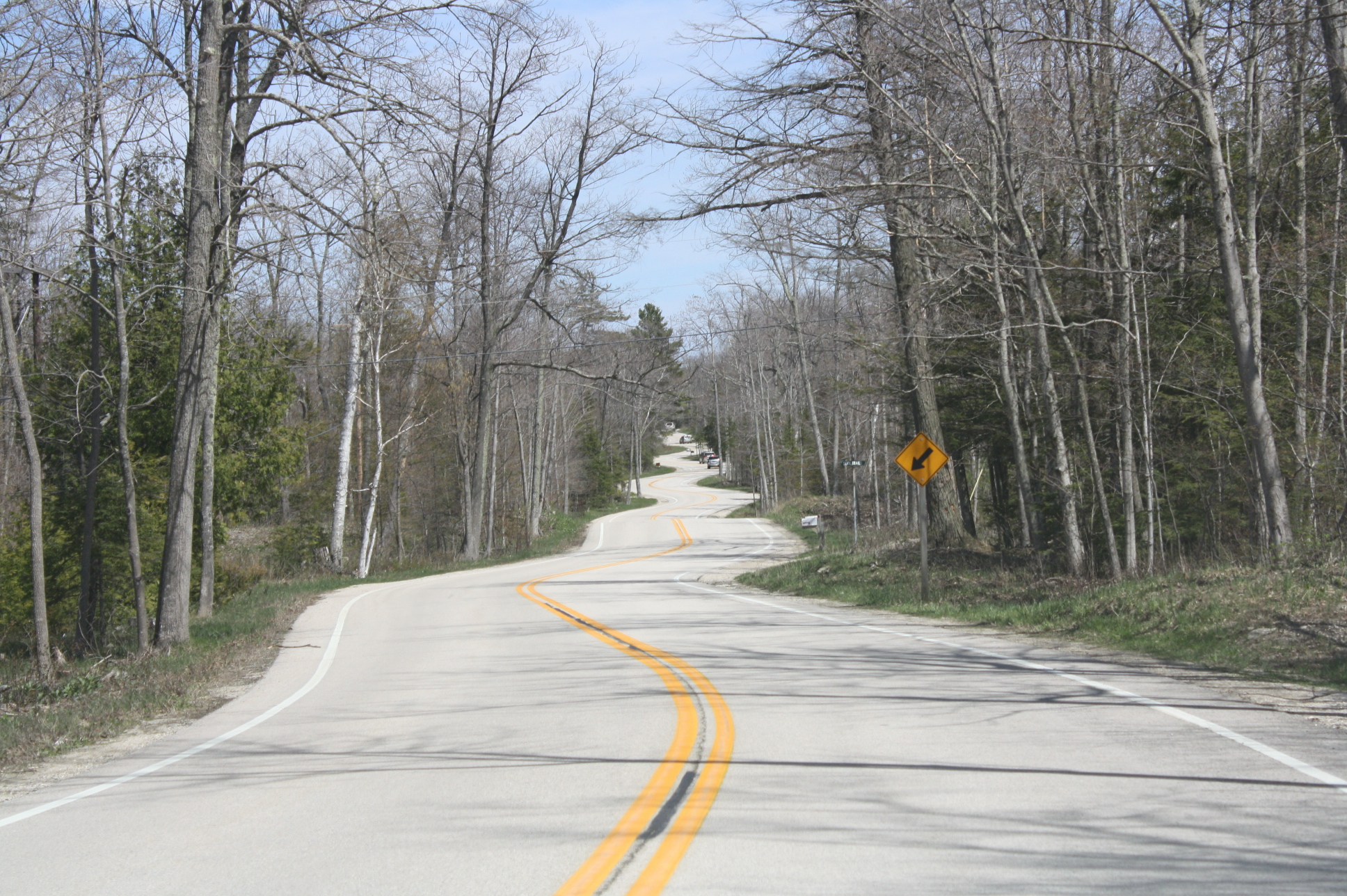
Curvy section near northern terminus

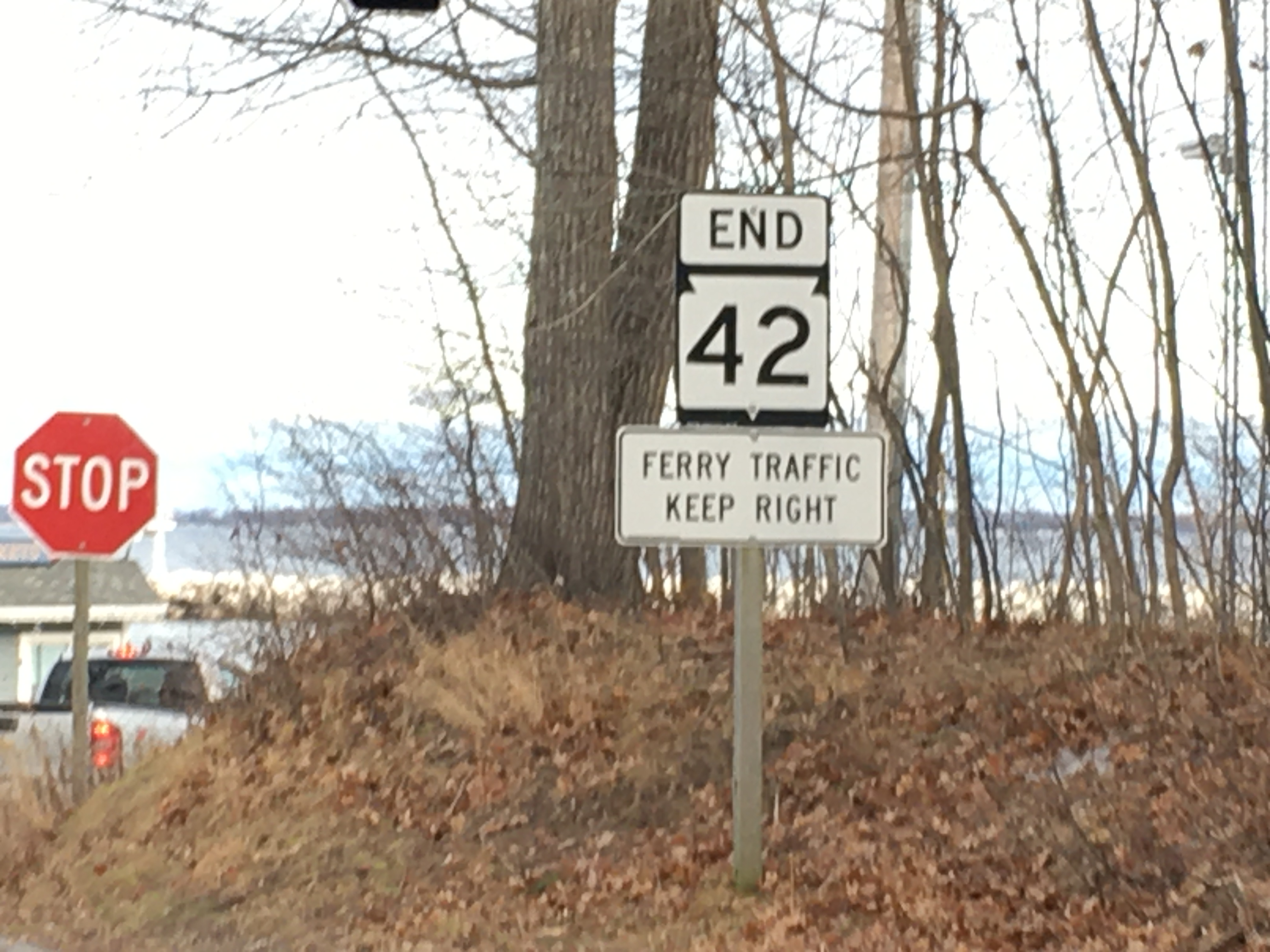
Northern terminus in 2020

Because of the geographical features and terrain of Door County, WIS 42 makes many abrupt turns as it nears its northern terminus at the tip of the Door Peninsula.

At its intersection with CTH-J in Forestville, WIS 42 heads directly north into Door County. In the unincorporated community Maplewood, Wisconsin, there is a small wayside park with parking, vault toilets and picnic tables in the center of town at the intersection of WIS 42, CTH-H, and the Ahnapee State Trail. The wayside park is open a half hour before sunrise to 11 p.m., although the trail is open all 24 hours. This is the only place where the trail crosses WIS 42.

Past Maplewood, WIS 42 meets with WIS 57 a few miles southwest of Sturgeon Bay, and heads to the northeast with WIS 57 into the city as Green Bay Road. WIS 42 and WIS 57 are the only two state highways to enter Door County.

=== Sturgeon Bay to northern Door County ===
WIS 42/WIS 57 crosses over the Sturgeon Bay Ship Canal to the southeast of downtown, bypassing the old Michigan Street bridge further upstream. A business route continues north on Green Bay Road to South Madison Avenue, crossing the canal on the Michigan Street bridge into downtown Sturgeon Bay. Turning left to the northwest on Third Avenue, the business route follows CTH-B to Jefferson Street, turning to the northeast on CTH-HH. CTH-HH jogs slightly north around Big Hill Park to Egg Harbor Road, where the business route turns northeast past the Door County Fairgrounds to its intersection with WIS 42/WIS 57 outside the city.

WIS 42 and 57 run concurrently for another mile to the north until WIS 57 turns to the East at Johns Lane. WIS 57 runs along the eastern shore of Door County until reaching its eastern terminus with WIS 42 in Sister Bay.

WIS 42 continues north on Egg Harbor Road to CTH-T just west of Egg Harbor. It then swings around and along the shore of Egg Harbor before continuing to the northeast towards Fish Creek.

Outside of Fish Creek, WIS 42 takes an abrupt left-hand turn to follow the bluff down to Main Street and the Alexander Noble House. WIS 42 makes an abrupt right onto Main Street and heads to the northeast past Peninsula State Park into the village of Ephraim.

In Ephraim, the road becomes Water Street as it runs along the shoreline of Eagle Harbor along Green Bay. It then curves to the northeast, becoming South Bay Shore Drive outside of Sister Bay. Meeting the northern terminus of WIS 57 at Gateway Drive, WIS 42 once again swings to the northeast towards Ellison Bay.

Just outside town, WIS 42 turns due east on School Road to its intersection with Europe Bay Road, where it turns north towards Gills Rock. At Gills Rock, WIS 42 turns due east and then turns slightly to the southeast before heading due east again to its eastern terminus at the Washington Island Ferry dock at Port Des Morts Drive in unincorporated town of Northport.

A stretch of the highway just before its northern terminus near Porte des Morts is well-renowned locally due to having 15 seemingly redundant curves causing the road to meander unnecessarily. The reasons for this winding section remain uncertain, with one theory assuming the bends were designed simply to weave around utility poles or to reduce the need for tree felling. However another suggests the serpentiform course of the road was an intentional design by Danish architect Jens Jensen.

== History ==
State Trunk Highway 17
- Location: Kenosha to Sister Bay
- Existed: 1917–1930

Prior to WIS 42, WIS 17 connected Kenosha to Sister Bay from 1917 to 1930.

WIS 42's current iteration began in 1930 as a route that almost entirely paralleled Lake Michigan from Pleasant Prairie to Algoma including Milwaukee and eventually reaching Sister Bay along its current routing including Sturgeon Bay. Prior to 1956 WIS 42 passed through the communities of Meeme, Spring Valley, and Newtonburg, these communities are now bypassed. However, WIS 32 replaced WIS 42 from Pleasant Prairie to Howards Grove in a move to commemorate the 32nd Division in 1951–52. WIS 42 along with WIS 57, formerly crossed over the Sturgeon Bay Bridge in Sturgeon Bay from 1931 to 1978, now following a southeast bypass of the city to alleviate congestion should the latter be cut off. The business route continues to cross over the historic bridge and the newer girder bridge built in 2008.

A meteorite 14 feet (4.3 m) in circumference struck 4 1/2 miles (7.2 km) north of Carlsville, Wisconsin. The bottom was eight feet (2.4 m) below ground and the top was two miles (3.2 km) above the surface. Most of it was crushed and used for the road which is now WIS 42 between Sturgeon Bay and Egg Harbor.

In 1988, WIS 42 was designated as part of the Great Lakes Circle Tour Lake Michigan Branch along with I-43 and WIS 57, including a privately designated tourist route from Manitowoc to Sturgeon Bay known as the Wisconsin Schooner Coast, due to the number of schooners that sank off the Lake Michigan especially along the two cities. Despite not being designated as a named highway, many locals refer to this stretch of highway as the Schooner Coast.

Highways around Manitowoc changed during September 2022, including the relocation of WIS 42 back onto its original alignment in the city and the reversion of 8th and 10th streets into two-way roads. Because of this, WIS 42's designation was removed from I-43.

== Major intersections ==
County	Location	mi	km	Destinations	Notes
Sheboygan	Sheboygan	0.00	0.00	WIS 23 west / WIS 28 west / LMCT (Erie Ave)	Southern terminus
Sheboygan	Town of Sheboygan	3.43	5.52	I-43 / LMCT – Milwaukee, Green Bay	Exit 128 on I-43
Sheboygan	Howards Grove	7.53	12.12	WIS 32 – Sheboygan Falls, Kiel	
Manitowoc	Manitowoc	26.18	42.13	US 151 south – Valders, Chilton, Fond du Lac	Western end of US 151 concurrency
Manitowoc	Manitowoc	26.58– 26.81	42.78– 43.15	I-43 / US 151 ends / LMCT – Milwaukee, Green Bay	Northern terminus of US 151; exit 149 on I-43; former southern terminus of Bus. WIS 42
Manitowoc	Manitowoc			10th Street	Former US 10 eastbound
Manitowoc	Manitowoc			US 10 east (8th Street)	Southern end of US 10 concurrency
Manitowoc	Manitowoc			US 10 west (Waldo Boulevard) to I-43	Northern end of US 10 concurrency
Manitowoc	Two Rivers	38.52	61.99	WIS 310 west (16th St)	Eastern terminus of WIS 310
Manitowoc	Two Rivers	38.92	62.64	WIS 147 north (22nd St) – Mishicot	Southern terminus of WIS 147
Kewaunee	Kewaunee	62.20	100.10	WIS 29 west – Green Bay	Eastern terminus of WIS 29
Kewaunee	Algoma	73.56	118.38	WIS 54 west (Jefferson Street) – Green Bay	Eastern terminus of WIS 54
Door	Town of Nasewaupee	86.66	139.47	WIS 57 south / LMCT – Green Bay	Southern end of WIS 57 concurrency
Door	Sturgeon Bay	91.86	147.83	Bus. WIS 42 north / Bus. WIS 57 north (Green Bay Road)	Southern end of Bus. WIS 42/Bus. WIS 57
Door	Sturgeon Bay	96.23	154.87	Bus. WIS 42 south / Bus. WIS 57 south (Egg Harbor Road)	Northern end of Bus. WIS 42/Bus. WIS 57
Door	Town of Sevastopol	97.54	156.98	WIS 57 north / LMCT – Jacksonport, Baileys Harbor	Northern end of WIS 57 concurrency
Door	Sister Bay	125.32	201.68	WIS 57 south / LMCT – Baileys Harbor, Sturgeon Bay	Northern terminus of WIS 57
Door	Gills Rock	135.62	218.26	Passenger ferry	Access via unsigned Spur WIS 42
Door	Northport	137.86	221.86	Carferry to Washington Island	Northern terminus
1.000 mi = 1.609 km; 1.000 km = 0.621 mi: Concurrency terminus

== Related highways ==
=== Former Sheboygan business route ===
Business State Trunk Highway 42
- Location: Sheboygan
- Existed: 1980–1993

There used to be a business route for WIS 42 in Sheboygan before I-43 was extended to Beloit, Wisconsin, however for I-43 itself (because Wisconsin rejected use of Business Interstates). This business route was removed in 1990 when WIS 28 was extended into Sheboygan.

=== Former Manitowoc business route ===
Business State Trunk Highway 42
- Location: Manitowoc
- Length: 4.5 mi (7.2 km)
- Existed: 1980–2022

Business State Trunk Highway 42 (Bus. WIS 42) ran along WIS 42's former routing in Manitowoc before I-43 was completed. It was entirely concurrent with US 10 and US 151. US 141 use to run along this route also. The business highway started at US 151 east of I-43 and continued along Calumet Avenue. It became Washington Street east of its intersection with Custer Street. It turned at 8th Avenue to follow US 10 westbound, while Bus. WIS 42 southbound followed 11th and 10th avenues along US 10 eastbound. It then ended at WIS 42 at Waldo Boulevard. It was removed in 2022 when Mantiowoc eliminated the one way trunk routes within the city Mantiowoc; the portion of the business route designation south of the river reverted to WIS 42.

=== Sturgeon Bay business route ===
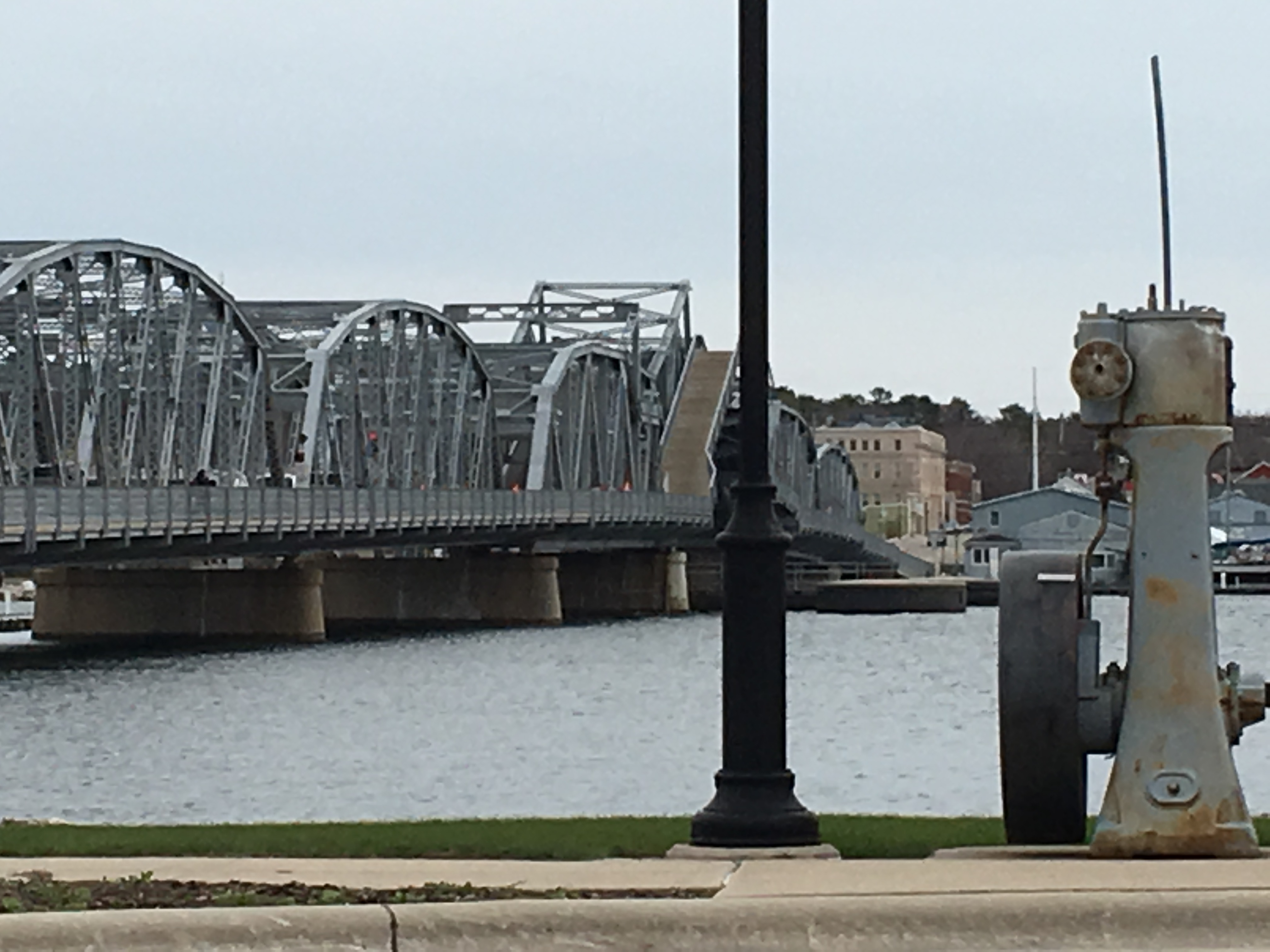
WIS 42/57 used to run across the Sturgeon Bay via the Sturgeon Bay Bridge until the Bayview Bridge opened in 1978. The business route still crosses the bridge

Business State Trunk Highway 42
- Location: Sturgeon Bay
- Length: 3.55 mi (5.71 km)
- Existed: 1977–present

Business WIS 42/57 traverses through downtown mainly following the older route. It starts off at an incomplete exit from WIS 42/57, and follows Green Bay Road to Madison Avenue. The road both turns right onto Maple Avenue, and continues onto Madison Avenue, then crossing the Sturgeon Bay on the Sturgeon Bay Bridge and the Oregon-Maple Street Bridge. They both meet up at the intersection of 3rd and Michigan, continuing onto 3rd Avenue. The route turns right onto Jefferson Street and follows 8th Avenue to Egg Harbor Road, where it continues for the rest of the route until terminating at a roundabout with WIS 42/57.

It used to follow Michigan Street all the way towards a roundabout for a brief time.

=== Gills Rock spur route ===
Spur State Trunk Highway 42
- Location: Gills Rock
- Length: 0.075 mi (121 m)

Spur WIS 42 is a connecting route between WIS 42 and the Island Clipper ferry in Gills Rock. The length of the spur is approximately 0.10 miles (160 m), the shortest highway in the Wisconsin state trunk highway system. The spur is one of three SPUR-designated state trunkline highways in the state along with Spur US 51 and Spur WIS 794. The Gills Rock ferry is a passenger-only ferry, where the one at Northport is an auto, freight and passenger ferry.

== See also ==
- Door County Coastal Byway (WIS 42 north of Sturgeon Bay to Northport is classified as a Wisconsin Scenic Byway and National Scenic Byway.)
