= West Harbour =

West Harbour may refer to:

- West Harbour, Auckland, New Zealand
- West Harbour, Otago, a former borough centered on the Dunedin, New Zealand suburb of Ravensbourne
- West Harbour, Helsinki
- West Harbour, Hamilton, Ontario, Canada
  - West Harbour GO Station, a commuter rail station operated by GO Transit in the neighbourhood
- West Harbour RFC, an Australian rugby union team

== See also ==
- North Harbour (disambiguation)
- South Harbour (disambiguation)
- West Harbor, a waterfront food hall and park under development in San Pedro, Los Angeles, California
- Western Harbour
