= South Harbor =

South Harbor may refer to:

- South Harbour, Nova Scotia, a small community in Nova Scotia, Canada
- South Harbour, Helsinki, Finland's largest passenger harbour
- South Harbor (RTA Rapid Transit station), a station on the RTA Waterfront Line portion of the Blue and Green Lines in Cleveland, Ohio, United States
- South Harbor Township, Minnesota, United States

== See also ==
- North Harbour (disambiguation)
- Southern Harbour
- West Harbour (disambiguation)
