= Wisconsin Highway 310 =

State highway in Wisconsin, United States

State Trunk Highway 310
- WIS 310 highlighted in red

Route information
- Maintained by WisDOT
- Length: 8.72 mi (14.03 km)
- Existed: 1984–present

Major junctions
- West end: I-43 / US 10 in Manitowoc
- East end: WIS 42 / LMCT in Two Rivers

Location
- Country: United States
- State: Wisconsin
- Counties: Manitowoc

Highway system
- Wisconsin State Trunk Highway System; Interstate; US; State; Scenic; Rustic
← WIS 253	→ WIS 311

State Trunk Highway 310 (STH-310, WIS 310, or Highway 310) is a state highway in the U.S. state of Wisconsin. It runs east–west in east-central Wisconsin from near Manitowoc to Two Rivers. The nearly nine-mile-long (14 km) road passes through mainly rural areas and intersects multiple County Highways along the way. The route came about in 1984 when US Highway 10 (US 10) was rerouted southbound with Interstate 43 (I-43) and County Trunk Highway D (CTH-D) fell into state control. It is also one of two state trunk highways connecting I-43 with WIS 42; the other is WIS 147.

== Route description ==
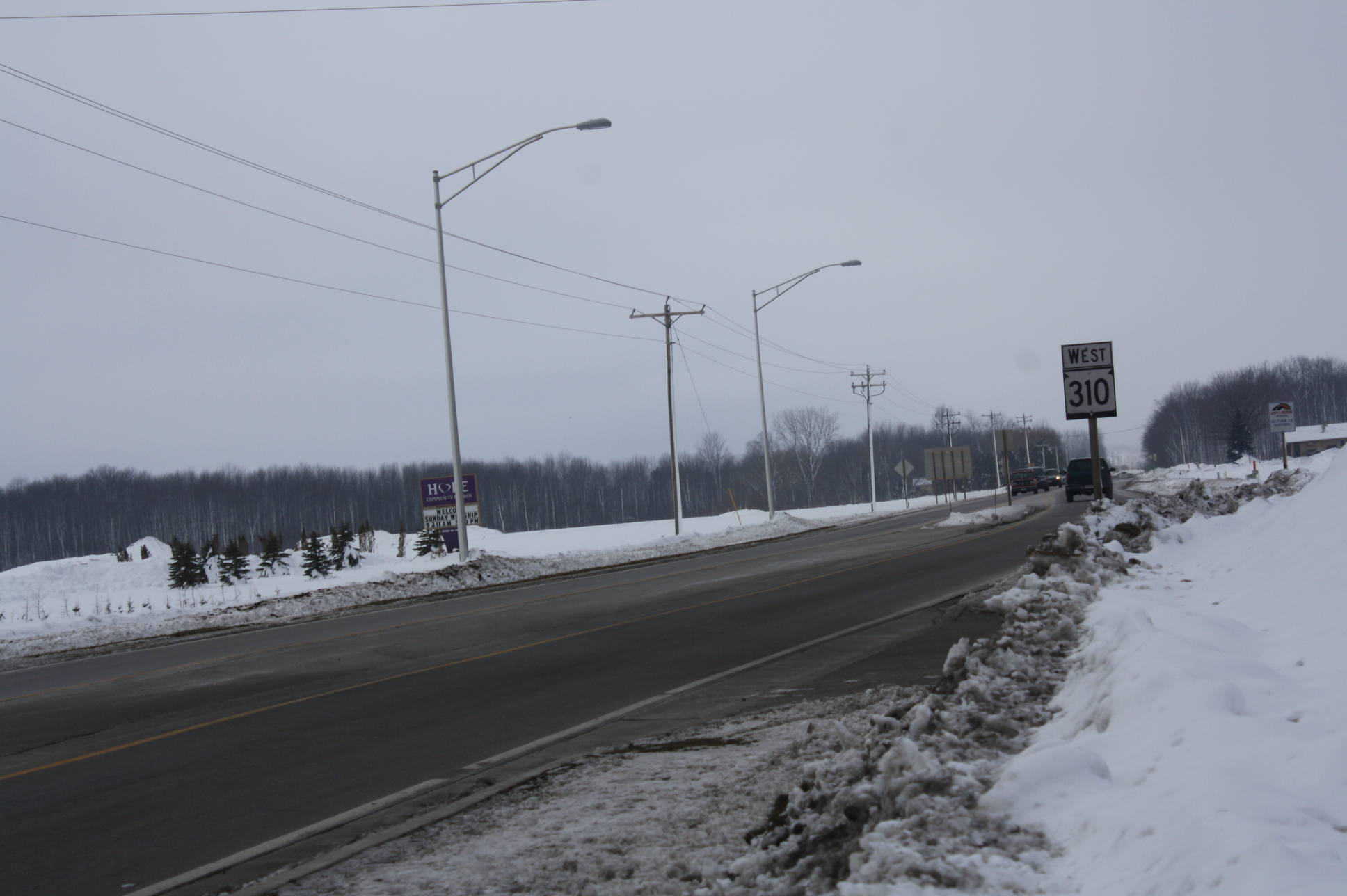
WIS 310

WIS 310 starts at exit 154 on I-43/US 10. WIS 310 is a four-lane highway for the first 0.3 miles (0.5 km) of its route. It then continues as a two-lane, rural highway. The road then intersects CTH-R, which leads north to Rockwood. WIS 310 then goes eastbound and crosses over the Little Manitowoc River. At 2.6 miles (4.2 km) WIS 310 intersects CTH-Q in a relatively remote area. Continuing eastbound the route continues through an area of marshland, and passes a large cemetery. CTH-B is the next major road that WIS 310 intersects. After this intersection the highway progresses through more rural farmland with patches of forest in between. After passing CTH-DD the road continues into a residential area in Two Rivers. WIS 310 becomes a southbound residential street while in Two Rivers known as Hawthorne Avenue, and then turns back eastbound where it meets its terminus at WIS 42.

== History ==
In 1984, US 10 was rerouted to run smoothly with I-43; the former US 10 was designated WIS 310. The remaining seven miles (11 km) of the road was part of CTH-D until the county government transferred the road to state control, and hence it became part of WIS 310. This route has not changed since.

== Major intersections ==
The entire highway is in Manitowoc County.

Location	mi	km	Destinations	Notes
Kossuth–Manitowoc Rapids town line	0.0	0.0	I-43 / US 10 east – Green Bay, Milwaukee US 10 west – Appleton	Exit 154 on I-43
Kossuth–Manitowoc Rapids town line	1.1	1.8	CTH-R (North Rapids Road)	
Kossuth–Manitowoc town line	2.6	4.2	CTH-Q	
Two Rivers–Manitowoc town line	3.5	5.6	CTH-B	
Two Rivers	8.72	14.03	WIS 42 / LMCT (Washington Street)	
1.000 mi = 1.609 km; 1.000 km = 0.621 mi
