= Meeme (community), Wisconsin =

Meeme, Wisconsin
- Unincorporated community
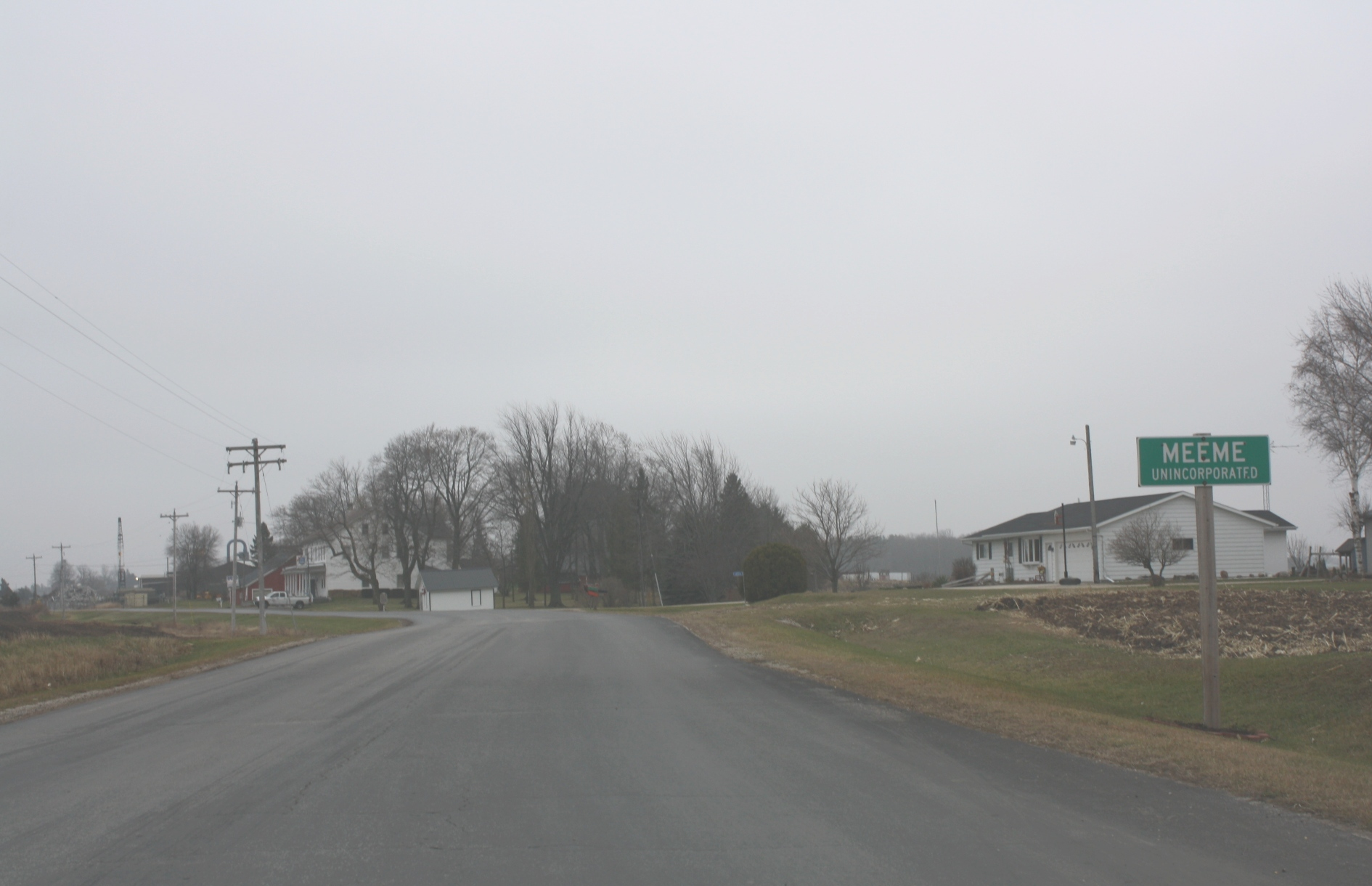
- Looking south at the Meeme sign

- Location within Wisconsin Location within the United States
- Coordinates: 43°55′14″N 87°49′53″W
- Country: United States
- State: Wisconsin
- County: Manitowoc
- Elevation: 781 ft (238 m)
- Time zone: UTC-6 (Central (CST))
  - Summer (DST): UTC-5 (CDT)
- Area code: 920
- GNIS feature ID: 1577723
- Website: https://www.townofmeemewi.com/

Meeme is an unincorporated community located in the town of Meeme, Manitowoc County, Wisconsin, United States. It is located at both the intersections of WIS-42 (which leads south to Sheboygan and north to Manitowoc and Sturgeon Bay) and CTH-XX (leading west to Kiel and east to Cleveland toward I-43)

== Images ==
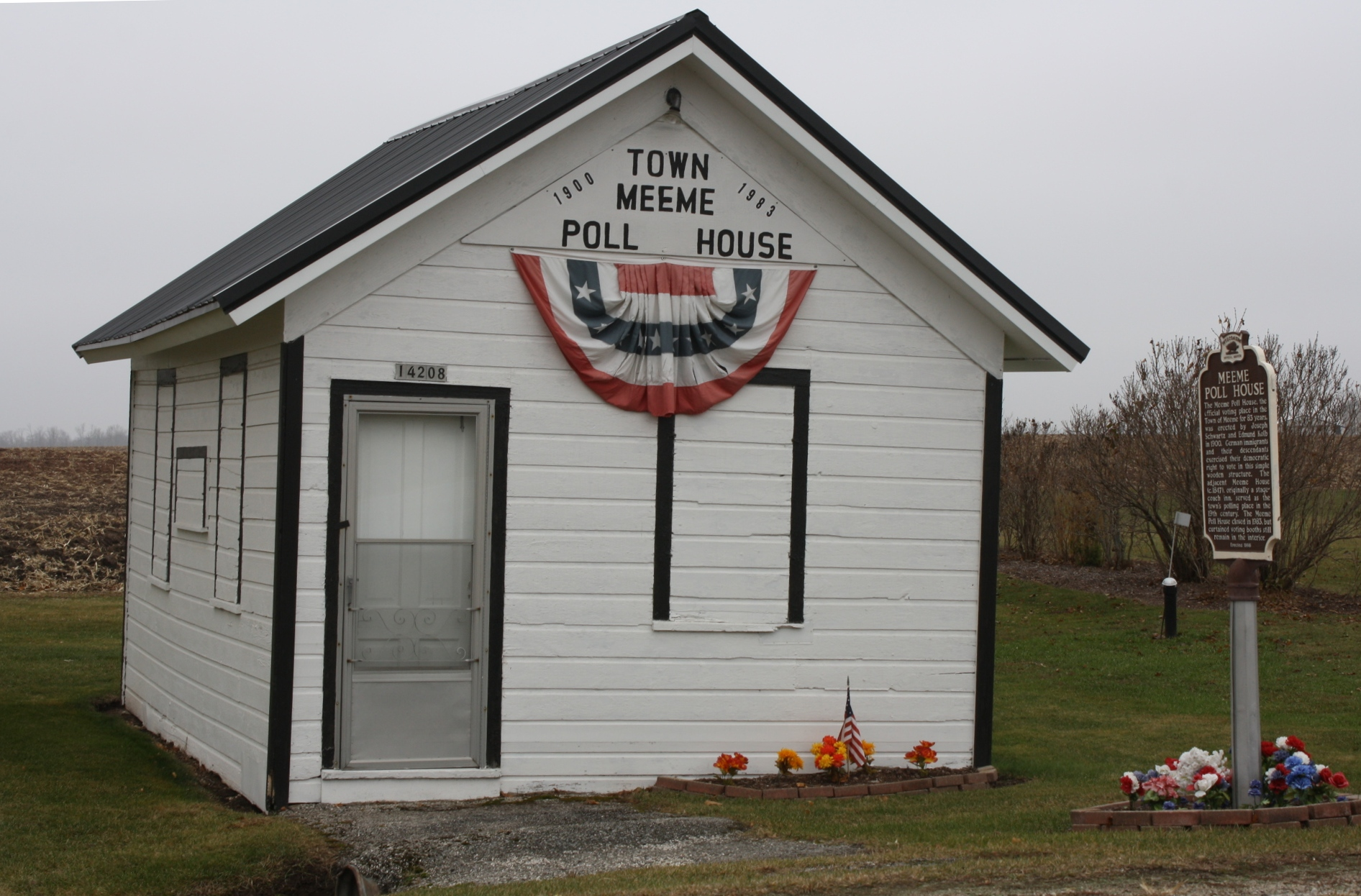
Poll station for the town of Meeme

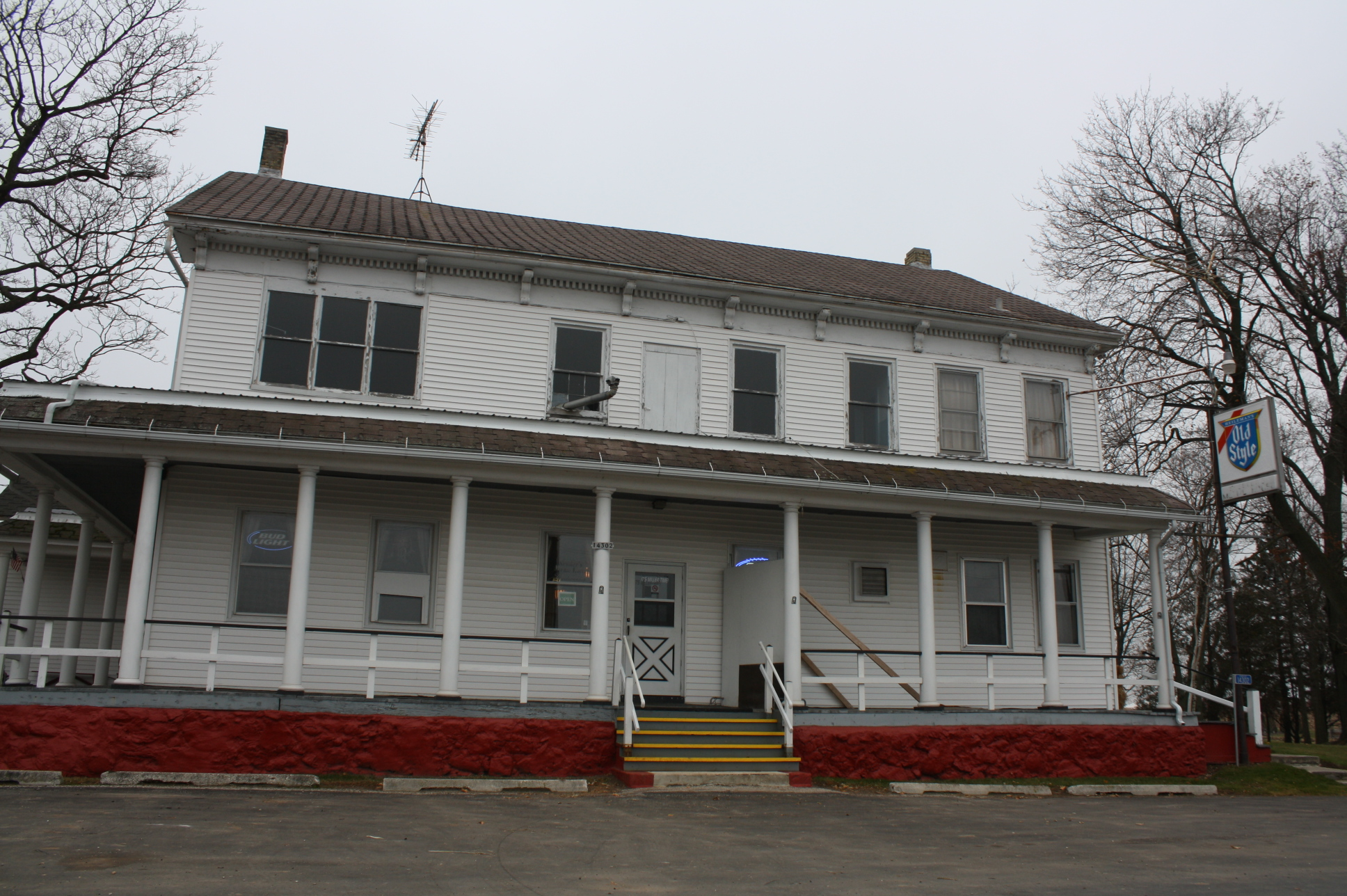
Meeme Pell house

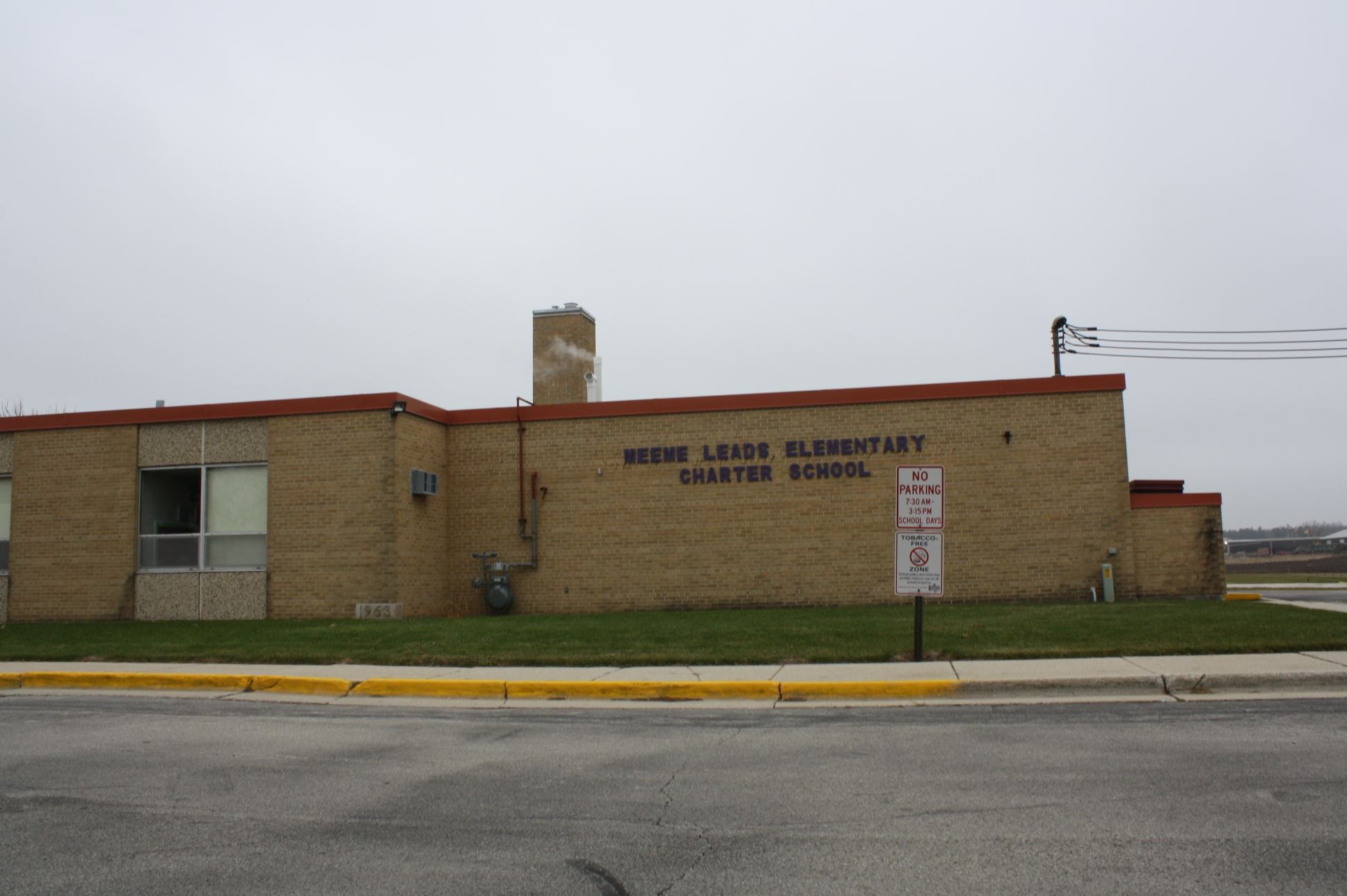
Meeme Leads Elementary Charter School
