= North Harbour =

North Harbour or North Harbor may refer to:

== Canada ==
- North Harbour, St. Mary's Bay, Newfoundland and Labrador, a community on St. Mary's Bay
- North Harbour, Placentia Bay, Newfoundland and Labrador, a community on Placentia Bay
- North Harbour, an unincorporated area in the Municipality of the County of Victoria, Nova Scotia
- North Harbour Island, a privately owned island in Lake Erie, administered by Ontario

== New Zealand ==
- North Harbour, a term used to describe the North Shore, Hibiscus Coast and Rodney in the Auckland Region
- North Harbour, a name used for Rosedale, Auckland
- North Harbour Rugby Union, the governing body for Rugby union in the North Harbour region
- North Harbour Stadium, a sports stadium in Auckland
- North Harbour (women's field hockey team)

== United States ==
- North Harbor, Illinois, an unincorporated community in Clinton County
- North Harbor Tower, a skyscraper in Chicago, Illinois

== Elsewhere ==
- North Harbour, Sydney, an inlet off Port Jackson extending into Manly Cove, Australia
- North Harbour, Portsmouth, a suburb of Portsmouth in South East England, United Kingdom

== See also ==
- North Port (disambiguation)
- Northport (disambiguation)
