= Wisconsin Highway 147 =

State highway in Wisconsin, United States

State Trunk Highway 147
- WIS 147 highlighted in red

Route information
- Maintained by WisDOT
- Length: 15.09 mi (24.29 km)

Major junctions
- South end: WIS 42 / LMCT in Two Rivers
- North end: I-43 / CTH-Z in Maribel

Location
- Country: United States
- State: Wisconsin
- Counties: Manitowoc

Highway system
- Wisconsin State Trunk Highway System; Interstate; US; State; Scenic; Rustic
| ← WIS 146 | → WIS 148 |

State Trunk Highway 147 (often called Highway 147, STH-147 or WIS 147) is a state highway in the U.S. state of Wisconsin. It runs in northwest–southeast in east central Wisconsin from near Maribel to Two Rivers. It is one of two state highways linking I-43 and WIS 42, the other being WIS 310.

== Route description ==
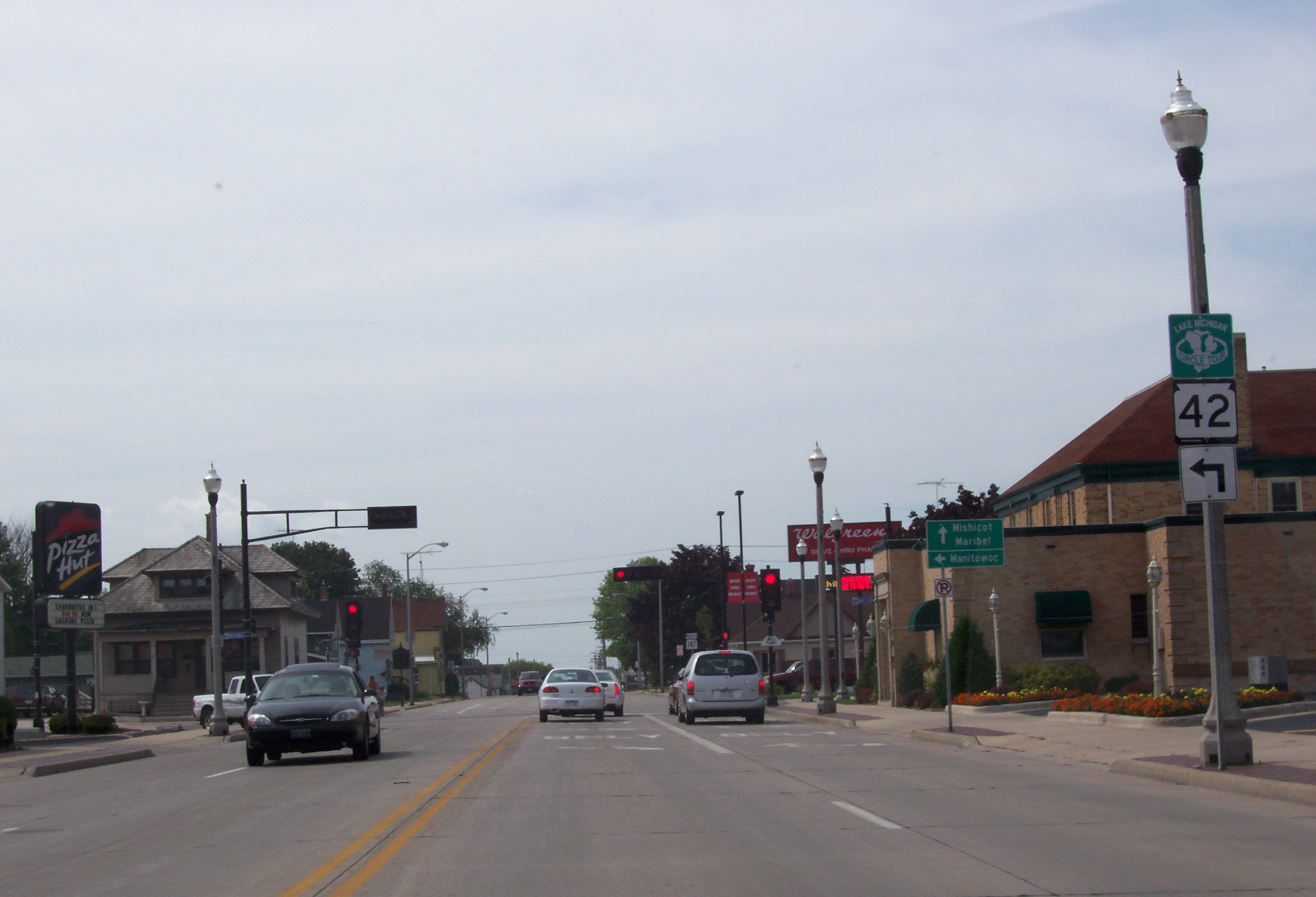
Southeast Terminus in Two Rivers

Highway 147's southern terminus ends at the corner of Washington and 22nd streets in Two Rivers. Highway 42 goes east toward Lake Michigan while 147 goes west. About 0.2 miles (0.3 km) later on 22nd street, 147 takes a right and becomes Forest Avenue. After going northwest for about 0.7 of a mile (1.13 km), Highway 147 continues northwest on what becomes Mishicot Road. Mishicot Road twists around for about 1.19 mi (1.91 km) until Highway 147 heads out of Two Rivers. The highway curves around for 3.15 miles (5.07 km) before visiting the Village of Mishicot. The road also becomes Main Street in Mishicot. Highway 147 continues on Main Street while crossing the East Twin River and County Highway B. About half of a mile outside of Mishicot, the road becomes mostly rural until the northern terminus where I-43 goes north and south and County Road Z continues westward to Maribel and Wayside.

== Major intersections ==
The entire route is in Manitowoc County.

| Location | mi | km | Destinations | Notes |
|---|---|---|---|---|
| Two Rivers | 0.00 | 0.00 | WIS 42 / LMCT – Manitowoc, Kewaunee | |
| Two Rivers | 2.06 | 3.32 | CTH-VV | |
| Mishicot | 7.31 | 11.76 | CTH-V | |
| Mishicot | 7.43 | 11.96 | CTH-B; CTH-V | Highway B is the former WIS 163 |
| Town of Gibson | 11.45 | 18.43 | CTH-Q | |
| Town of Cooperstown | 14.65 | 23.58 | CTH-R | |
| Town of Cooperstown | 14.71 | 23.67 | CTH-Z | |
| Town of Cooperstown | 15.09 | 24.29 | I-43 – Milwaukee, Green Bay | Exit 164 on I-43 |
1.000 mi = 1.609 km; 1.000 km = 0.621 mi
