= Northport =

Northport may refer to:

== Places ==
=== United States ===
- Northport, Alabama
- Northport, Maine
- Northport, Michigan
- Northport, Nebraska
- Northport, New York
  - Northport High School
- Northport, Washington
- Northport, Door County, Wisconsin
- Northport, Waupaca County, Wisconsin
- Northport Branch, a part of the Long Island Rail Road system

=== Other countries ===
- Northport, Malaysia, in Port Klang
- Northport, Nova Scotia, Canada
- Northport, New Zealand, the port at Marsden Point, Northland

== Other uses ==
- NorthPort Batang Pier, Filipino professional basketball team

== See also ==
- North Port (disambiguation)
