= Baileys Harbor (CDP), Wisconsin =

Census-designated place in Wisconsin, United States

Baileys Harbor, Wisconsin
- Census-designated place
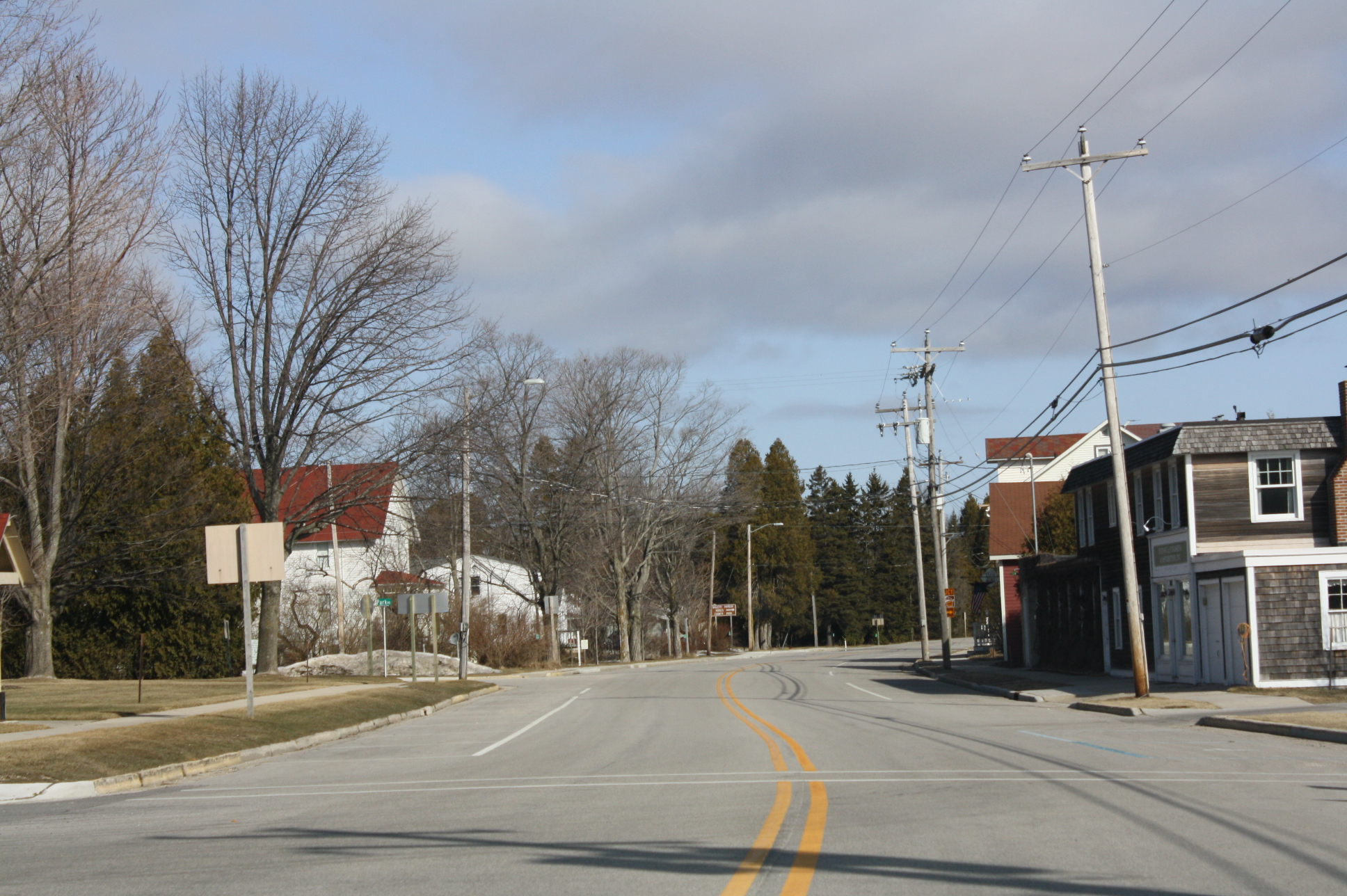
- Downtown Baileys Harbor

- Location within the state of Wisconsin
- Coordinates: 44°57′6″N 87°20′12″W
- Country: United States
- State: Wisconsin
- County: Door
- Town: Baileys Harbor

Area
  - Total: 1.687 sq mi (4.37 km^{2})
  - Land: 1.684 sq mi (4.36 km^{2})
  - Water: 0.003 sq mi (0.0078 km^{2})
- Elevation: 732 ft (223 m)

Population (2010)
  - Total: 257
  - Density: 153/sq mi (58.9/km^{2})
- Time zone: UTC-6 (Central (CST))
  - Summer (DST): UTC-5 (CDT)
- Area code: 920

Baileys Harbor is a census-designated place in Door County, within the town of Baileys Harbor, Wisconsin, United States. The community is located on Wisconsin Highway 57 northeast of Jacksonport. As of the 2010 census, its population was 257.

== History ==
It was the first established village on the Door Peninsula and was named after Captain Justice Bailey, who while seeking refuge from a violent storm on Lake Michigan found sanctuary in the sheltered harbor in 1848.

== Gallery ==
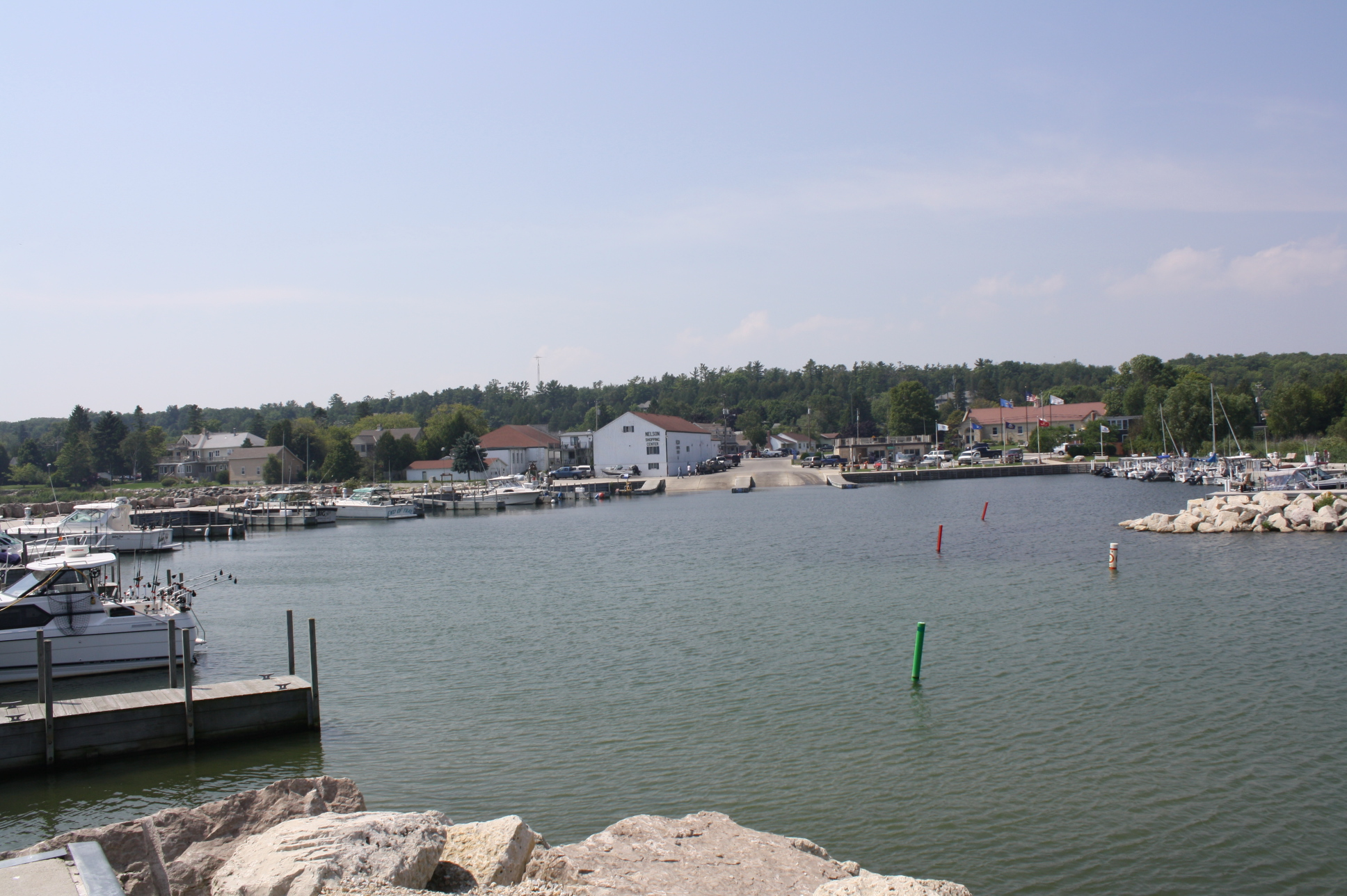
Panorama from harbor

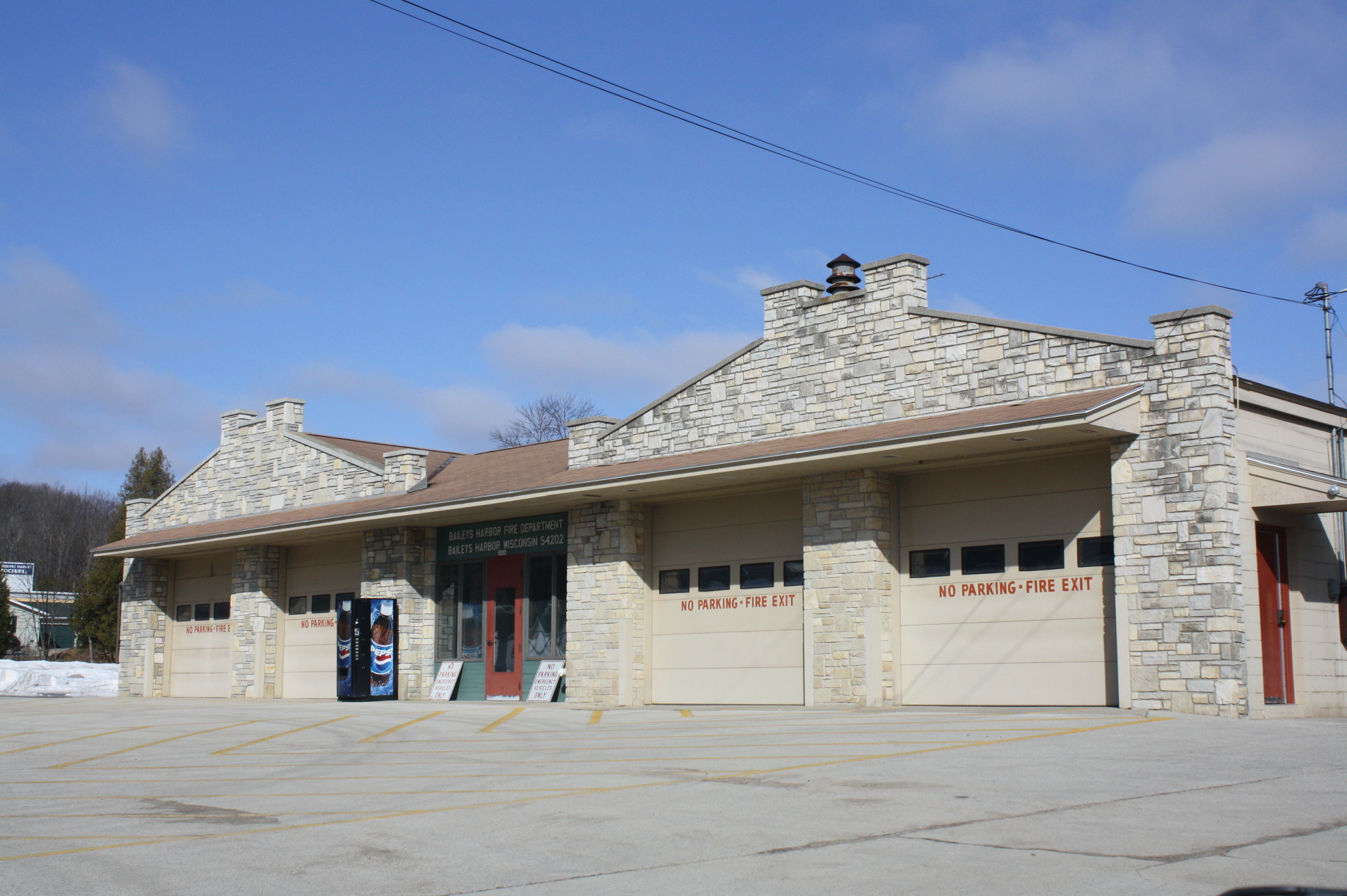
Fire station

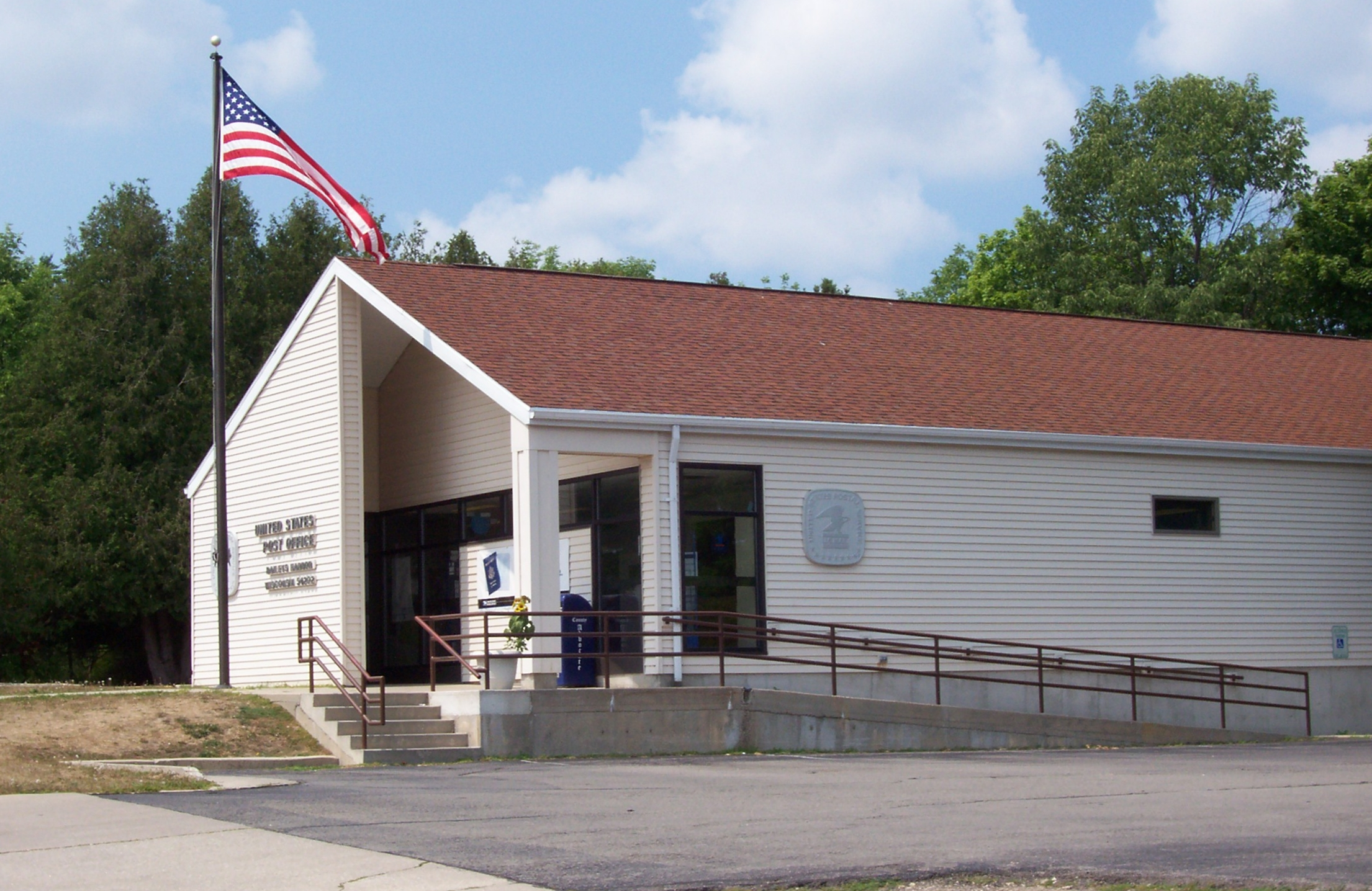
Post Office

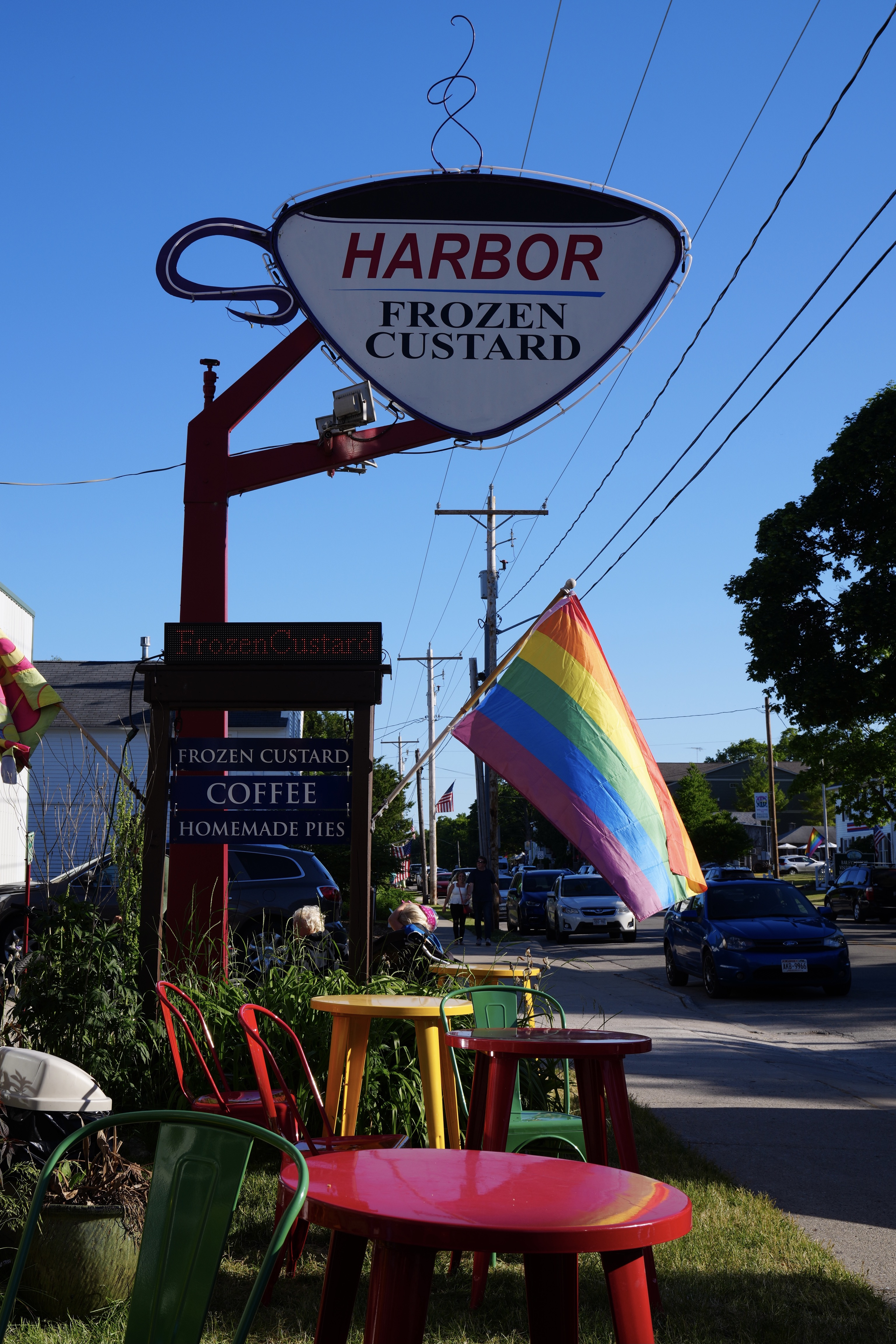
A tourist-oriented business

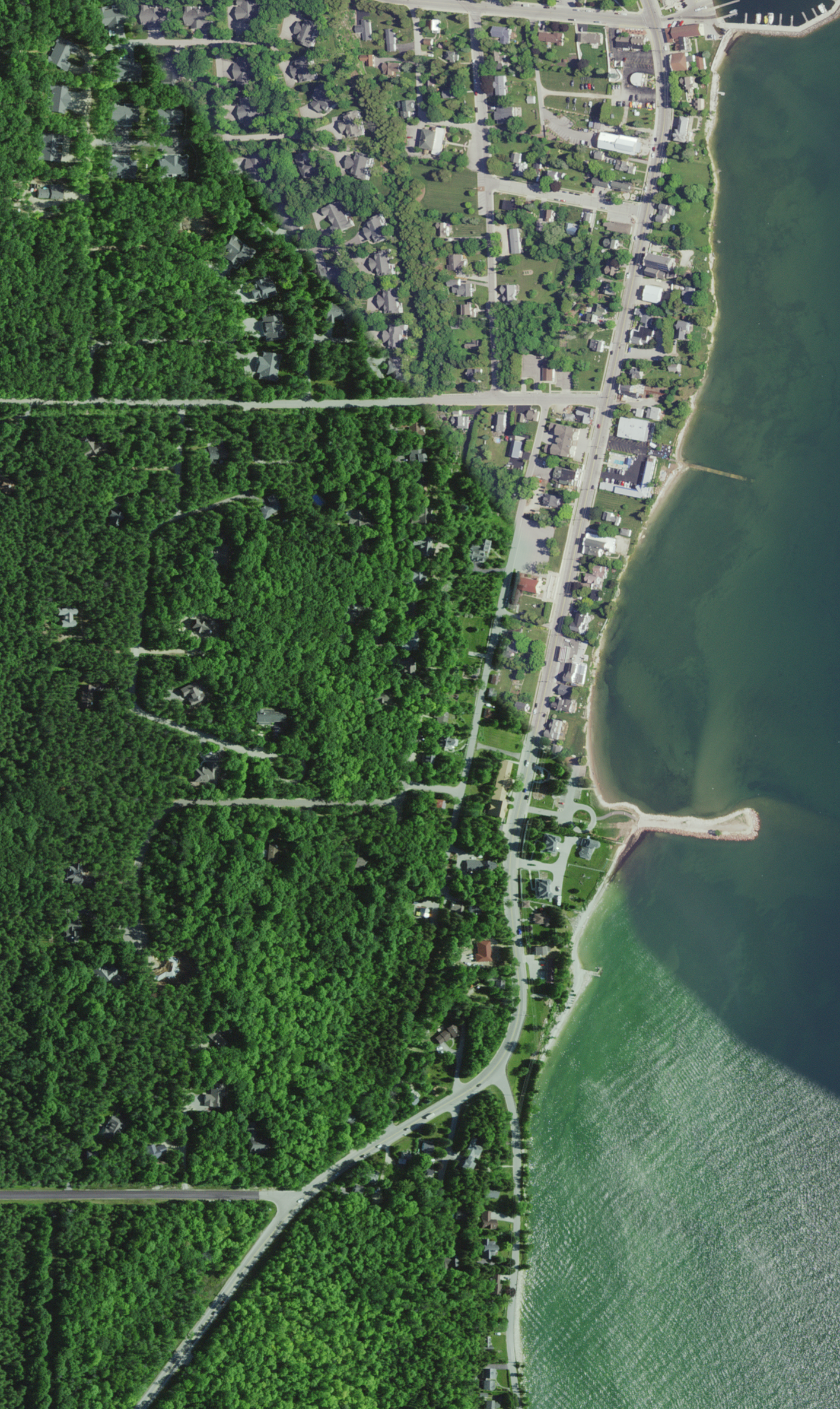
Southern and central community of Baileys Harbor and vicinity

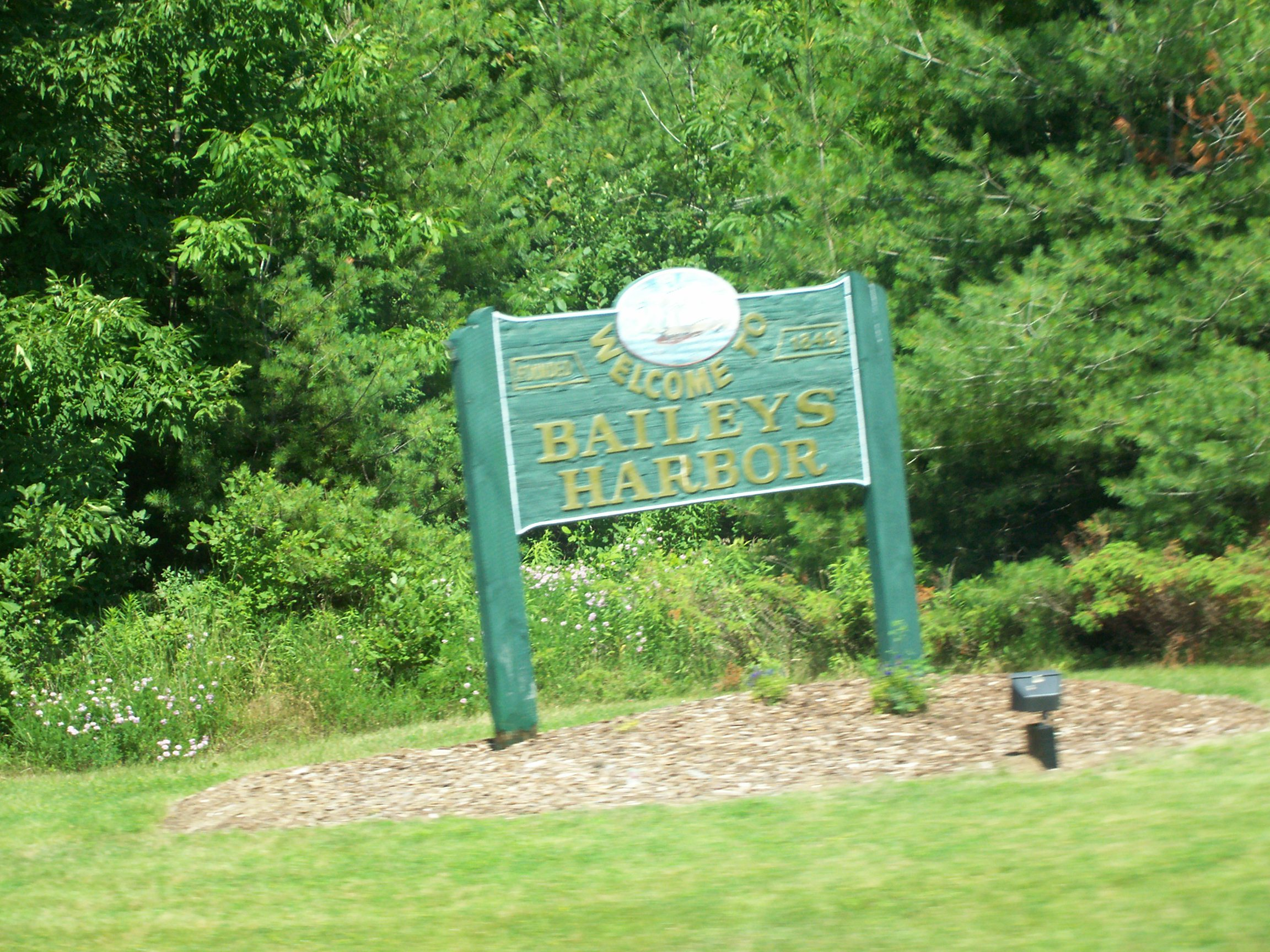
Welcome sign

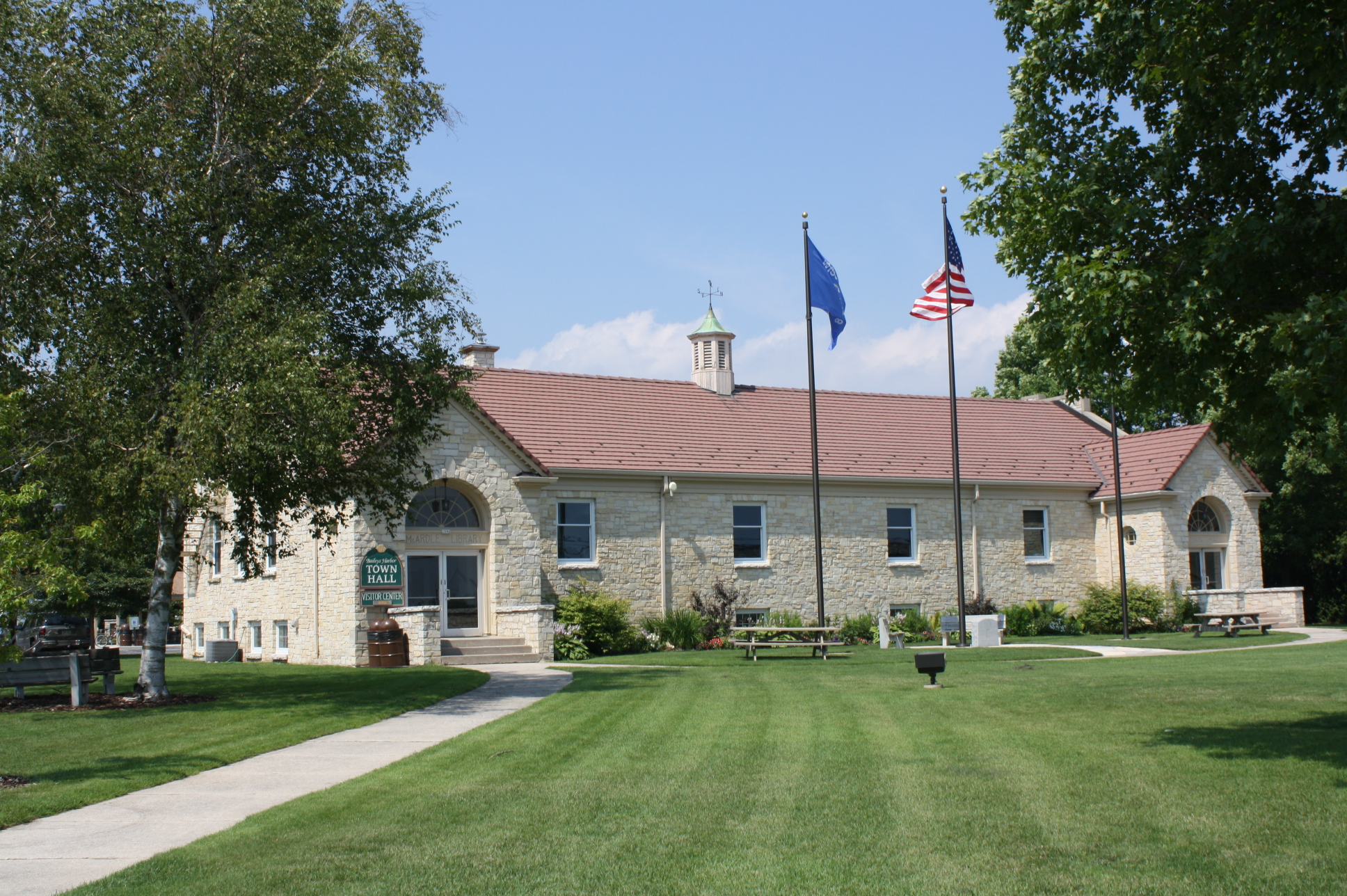
Town hall / Library

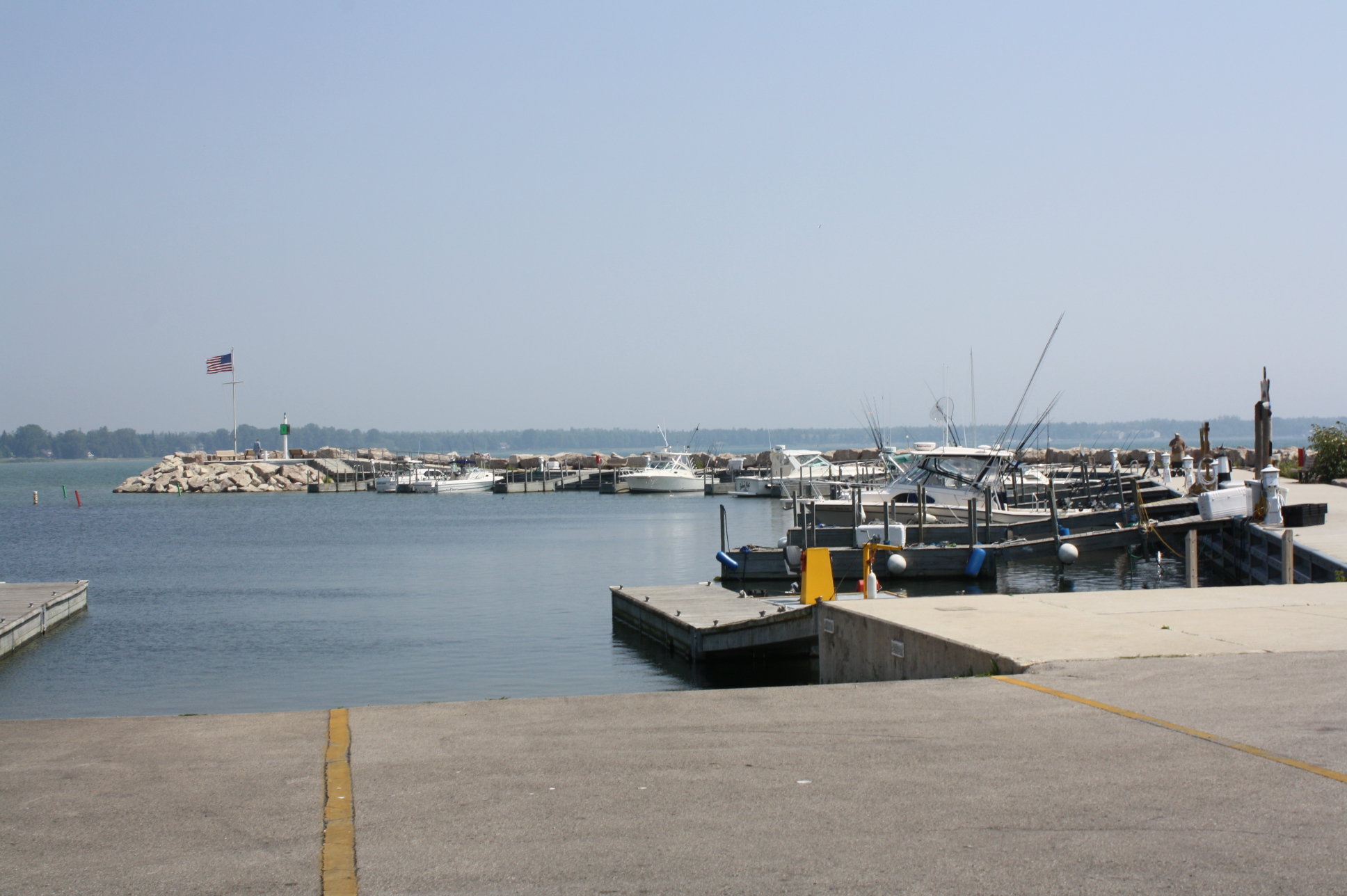
Harbor
