= North Port =

North Port may refer to a number of places or things:

- Beigang Island, Hainan, China
- North Port, Florida, United States of America
- North Port Distillery, in Angus, Scotland
- North Port Oval, a cricket stadium in Port Melbourne, Australia
- North Port light rail station, Melbourne, Australia

== See also ==
- Northport (disambiguation)
