= Northport, Door County, Wisconsin =

Northport, Wisconsin
- Unincorporated community
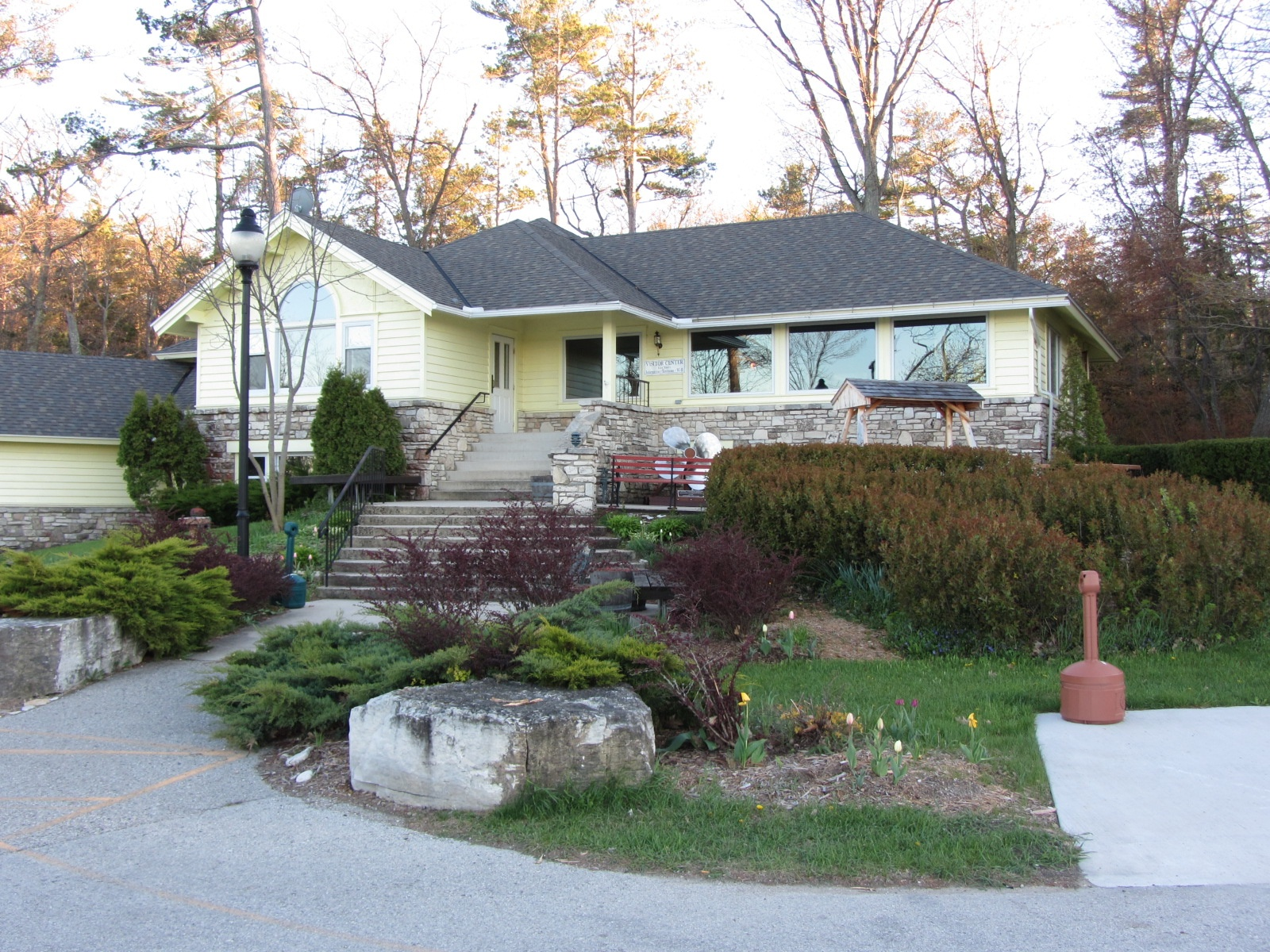
- Northport Visitors' Center

- Location within the state of Wisconsin
- Coordinates: 45°17′31″N 86°58′48″W
- Country: United States
- State: Wisconsin
- County: Door
- Town: Liberty Grove
- Elevation: 594 ft (181 m)
- Time zone: UTC-6 (Central (CST))
  - Summer (DST): UTC-5 (CDT)
- Area code: 920
- GNIS feature ID: 1570530

Northport is an unincorporated community in the town of Liberty Grove in Door County, Wisconsin, United States. It is the northern terminus of WIS 42 and location of the peninsula-side ferry dock of the Washington Island Ferry. The ferry takes freight, vehicles, and passengers across the Porte des Morts strait to Washington Island.

== Gallery ==
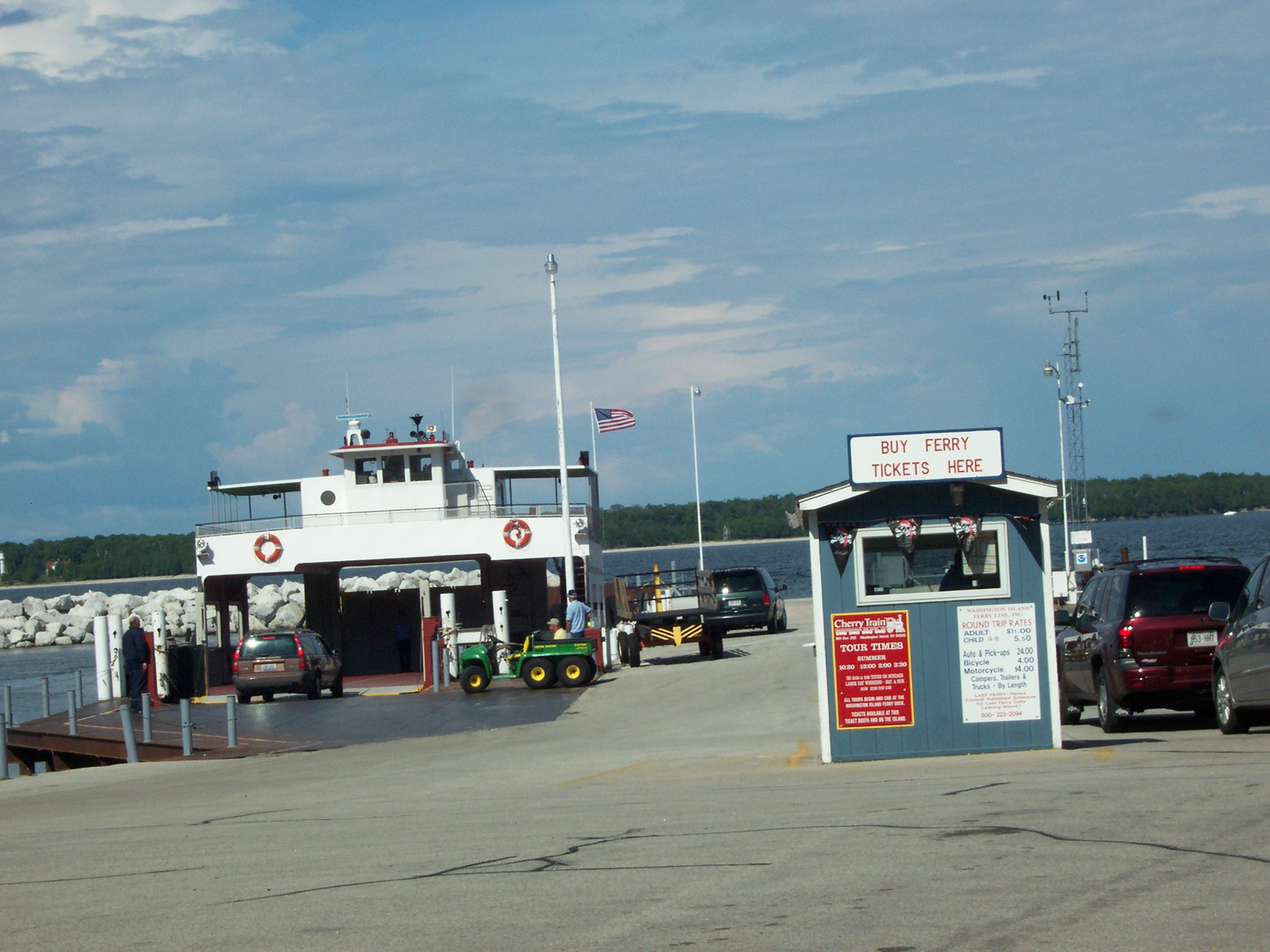
Ferry dock

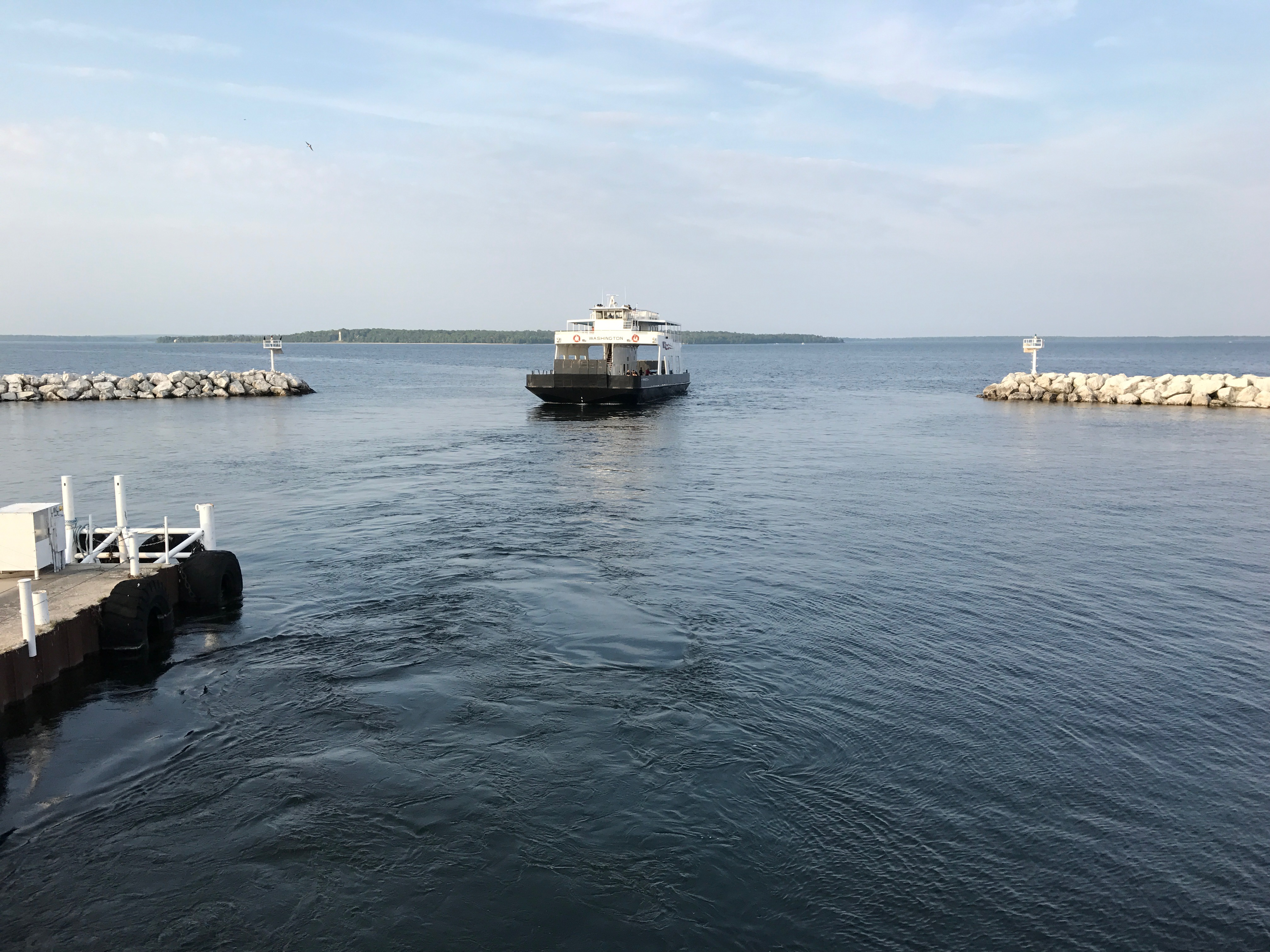
The Washington leaves the ferry dock at Northport.

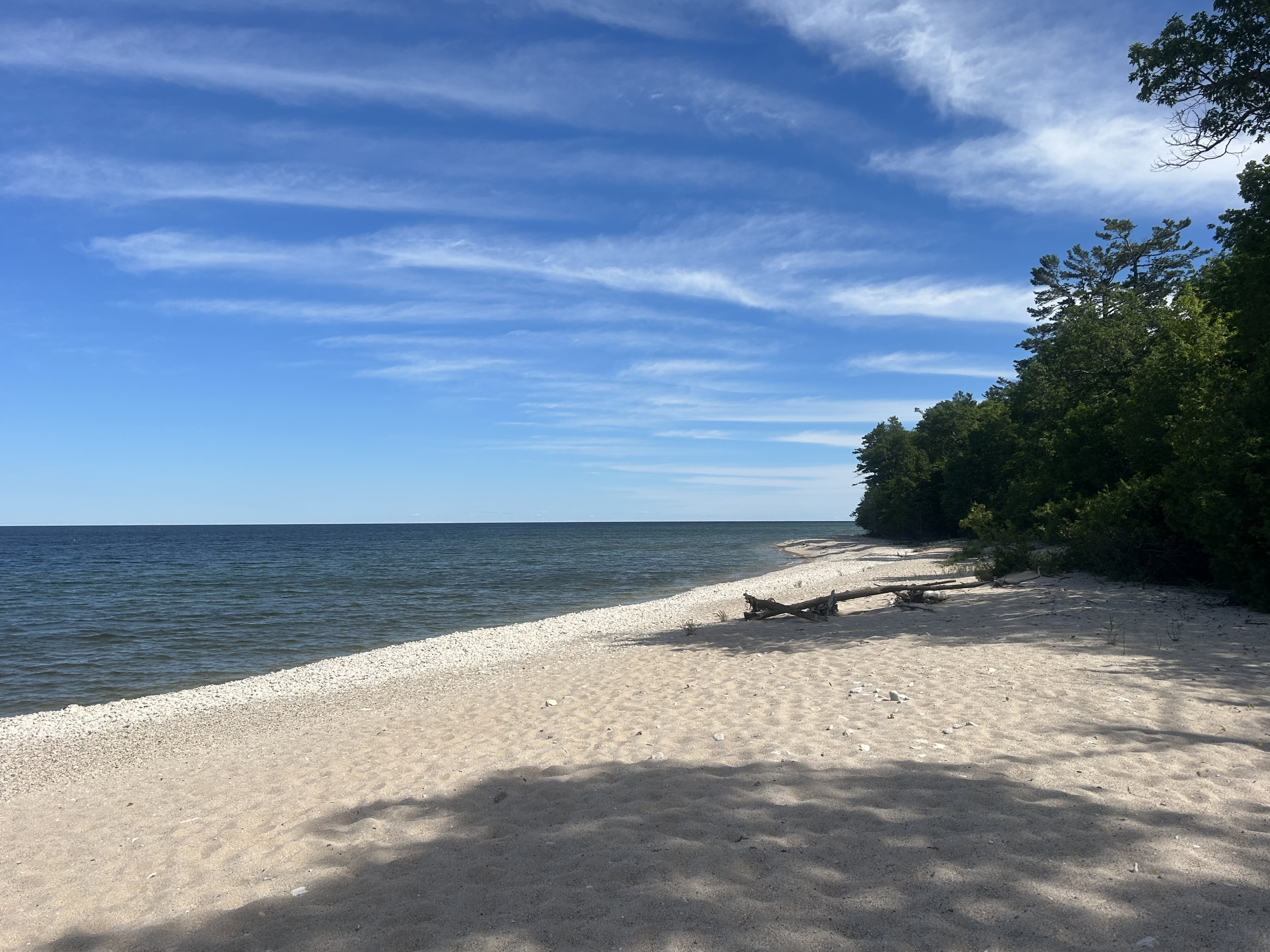
The beach at Northport
