= Wisconsin Islands Wilderness =

Wilderness area in Wisconsin, United States

- IUCN category Ib (wilderness area)
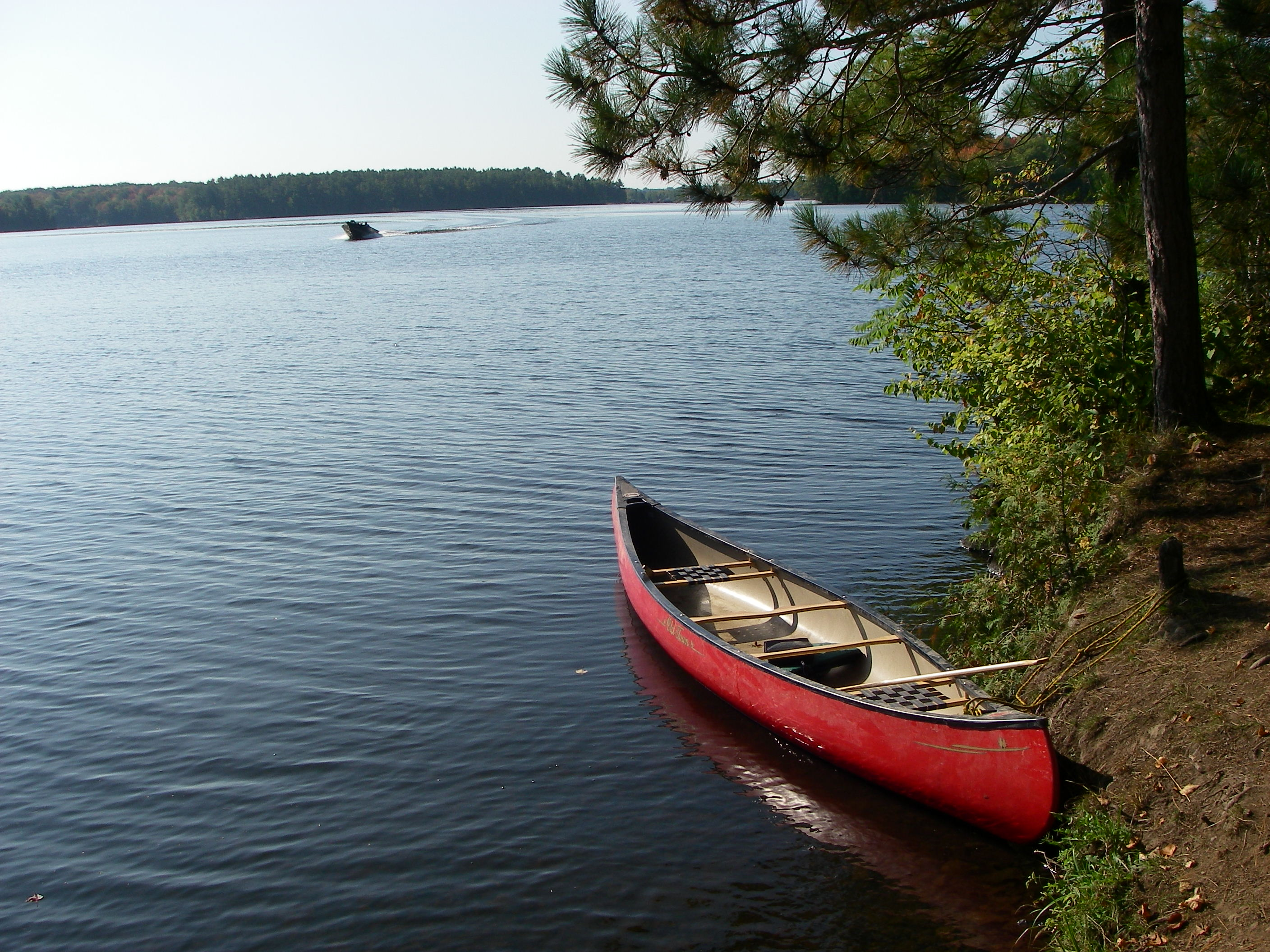

- Location within Wisconsin Location within the United States
- Location: Door County, Wisconsin, USA
- Nearest city: Liberty Grove, Wisconsin
- Coordinates: 45°12′32″N 86°58′38″W
- Area: 29 acres (12 ha)
- Established: 1970
- Governing body: United States Fish & Wildlife Service

The Wisconsin Islands Wilderness is a 29-acre (12 ha) wilderness area located in Door County in northeastern Wisconsin. It is one of the smallest wilderness areas in the United States. Managed by the U.S. Fish & Wildlife Service, the wilderness area is composed of three islands in Lake Michigan.

== History ==
The islands comprising the Wisconsin Islands Wilderness were initially declared a national preserve and breeding ground for migratory birds around 1913, and designated as wildlife refuges shortly thereafter. Plum Island and Pilot Island both have lighthouse facilities (the Plum Island Range Lights and the Pilot Island Light, both on the U.S. National Register of Historic Places), and have had minor U.S. Coast Guard presence, even as late as 2007. However, Spider, Hog, and Gravel Islands have always remained uninhabited in the post-settlement era. In 1970, these three islands were designated a wilderness area under the Wilderness Act.

== Description ==
The Wisconsin Islands Wilderness is managed by the U.S. Fish & Wildlife Service and is composed of three islands in Lake Michigan:

- Spider Island, off the eastern coast of the tip of the Door Peninsula near Newport State Park. At 23 acres (9.3 ha), it is the largest of the three islands. Spider Island is also designated as part of Gravel Island National Wildlife Refuge.
- Gravel Island, a four-acre (1.6 ha) island also off the eastern coast of the Door Peninsula, near Europe Bay, and the source of the name for the Gravel Island National Wildlife Refuge.
- Hog Island, a two-acre (0.81 ha) island off the eastern coast of Washington Island, across the Porte des Morts from the Door Peninsula. Hog Island is in the Green Bay National Wildlife Refuge.

The three islands are largely limestone and dolomite outcroppings of the Niagara Escarpment, exhibit geology typical of changing water levels and glaciation, and rise only a few feet above the surface of Lake Michigan. Canadian yew, red raspberry, and red-berried elder grow on Hog Island, while only the remnants of a mixed birch, cedar, and tamarack forest remains on Spider Island, after having succumbed to thousands of nesting birds. There is no known vegetation on Gravel Island.

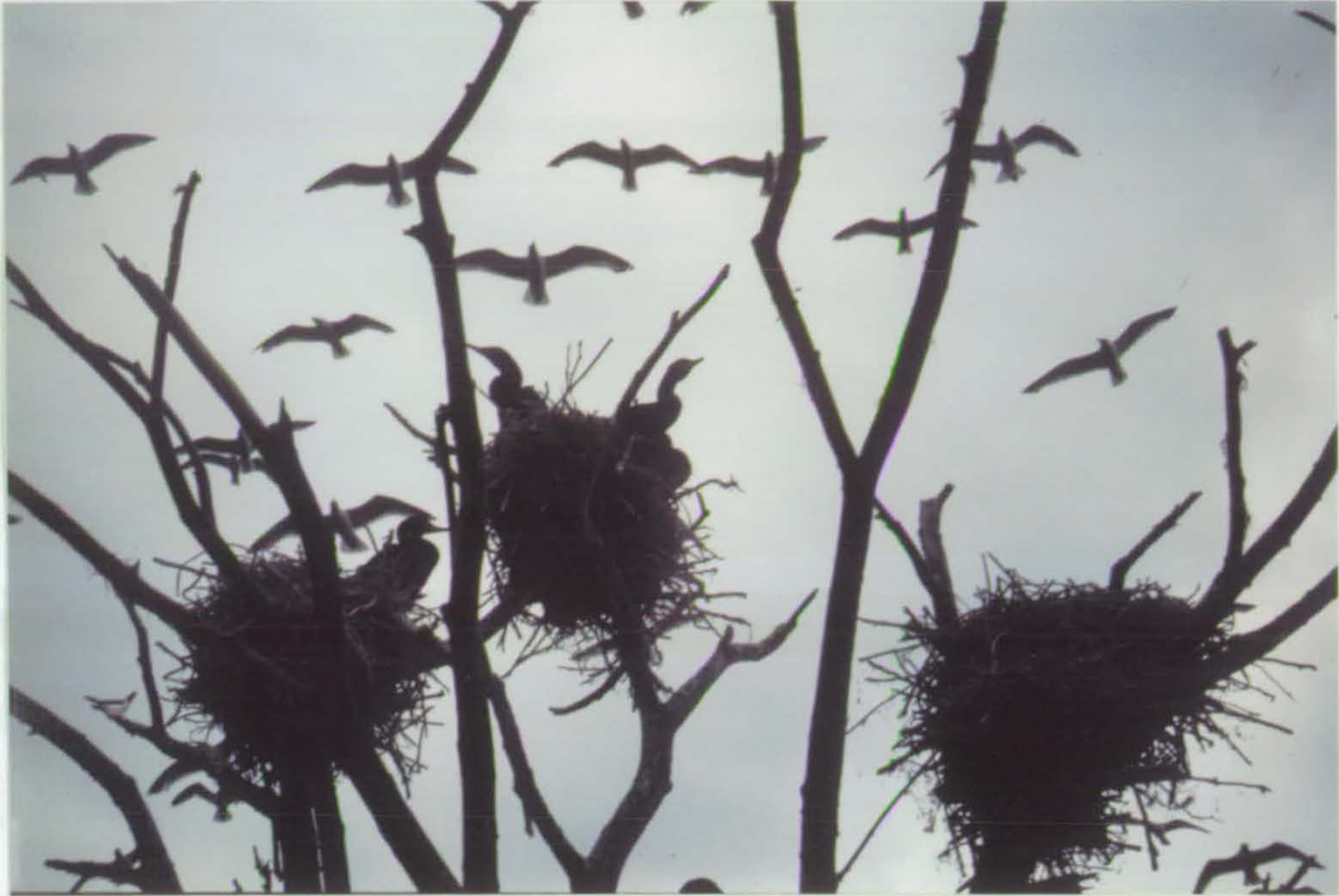
Double-crested cormorant colony on Spider Island with ring-billed gulls flying in background, July 1992

The nesting grounds of the islands support many types of colonial birds, including shorebirds, seabirds, and ducks. Spider and Gravel Islands are one of the westernmost breeding grounds of the great black-backed gull. All three islands have significant colonies of herring gulls and double-crested cormorants. Caspian terns can be found on Gravel Island. Spider Island also supports a number of waterfowl species, including the American black duck, Canada geese, and the mallard. Red-breasted mergansers and great blue herons can be found on Hog Island.

Contrary to the original plan when the Wilderness Area was founded, no public access is allowed. This is due to the fragile nature of the bird habitats. Boaters are required to stay one-quarter mile (0.40 km) from shore, both to limit accidents on the rocky shoals surrounding the islands and to protect the nesting bird species. In 1969, a joint meeting of several U.S. House subcommittees was held in preparation for the Wilderness Area designation. U.S. Representatives present at the meeting were told by John Gottschalk, the Director of the Bureau of Sport Fisheries and Wildlife, that out of the six lake islands included in the plans for the Wisconsin Islands Wilderness and the Michigan Islands Wilderness, five of them would be open to the general public.

== See also ==
- List of U.S. Wilderness Areas
