= Green Bay National Wildlife Refuge =

American protected area

- IUCN category IV (habitat/species management area)
- Location within the United States
- Location: Washington, Door County, Wisconsin and Fairbanks, Delta County, Michigan
- Coordinates: 45°19′N 86°57′W
- Area: 1,600.7 acres (6.478 km^{2})
- Governing body: U.S. Fish and Wildlife Service
- Website: Green Bay National Wildlife Refuge

Green Bay National Wildlife Refuge is a National Wildlife Refuge of the United States located in the state of Wisconsin. It includes all or part of six islands in Lake Michigan: Hog Island, Plum Island, Pilot Island, part of St. Martin Island and Rocky Island. Additionally it includes part of Detroit Island. The islands are near Washington Island off the tip of the Door Peninsula of Wisconsin and the Garden Peninsula of Michigan.

== History ==
An executive order in 1913 declared Hog Island a national preserve for the benefit of native birds. Plum and Pilot Island were transferred from the U.S. Coast Guard to the U.S. Fish and Wildlife Service in 2007.

The Green Bay National Wildlife Refuge became the second National Wildlife Refuge in Great Lakes area and the 28th overall. Gravel Island National Wildlife Refuge was created under the same executive order. In 1970, the islands which at the time where included in the Green Bay National Wildlife Refuge and Gravel Island National Wildlife Refuge were declared part of the Wisconsin Islands Wilderness Area. This wilderness area is one of the smallest in the entire United States. The refuge is managed by staff at the Horicon National Wildlife Refuge, in Mayville, Wisconsin. Public use of the land is prohibited on the islands which are located in the wilderness area, contrary to the testimony given before a joint meeting of several U.S. House subcommittees in preparation for the establishment of the Wilderness Area. In 1969, the U.S. Representatives present at the subcommittee meeting were told that out of a group of six lake islands including the islands in the proposed Wisconsin Islands Wilderness, five out of six of them would be open to the general public.

Lighthouse facilities were constructed on Plum Island and Pilot Island. By 1939, the Coast Guard had taken control of Plum Island, and acquired control of the lighthouse on the island. The old wooden lighthouse was eventually replaced with a steel structure in 1964, and workers were moved to the island in order to oversee the operations of the lighthouse. At this time the lighthouse used range lights. By 1969, these lights were replaced with an automatic lighting system. The lighthouse is still in use today, but Coast Guard employees no longer remain on the island to operate it. The Plum Island Range Lights and the Pilot Island Light are listed in the National Register of Historic Places.

On October 17, 2007, Pilot and Plum Islands were officially added to the Green Bay National Wildlife Refuge. Previously under the control of the United States Coast Guard, they are now managed by the United States Fish and Wildlife Service.

== Geography and geology ==
Hog Island covers 2 acres (8,100 m^{2}) of land, Plum Island 325 acres (1.32 km^{2}), and Pilot Island approximately 3.7 acres (15,000 m^{2}).

The islands are part of the Niagara Escarpment as opposed to the Black River or Magnesian escarpments. The underlying bedrock is dolomite. The area was sculpted by glaciers. The islands have been eroded, inundated, and re-shaped over many years by changing water levels.

== Biota ==
=== Flora ===
Green Bay National Wildlife Refuge contains a variety of plants native to the area. Hog Island has an abundance of Canada yew. This plant was functionally extirpated on St. Martin's Island because of the introduction of white-tailed deer and their appetite for this shrub. The rare dwarf lake iris (Iris lacustris) can be found along the shoreline of Plum Island. Plum Island is most well known for having large forests of basswood, sugar maple, and white cedar. These trees are associated with the dolomite geology of the area.

=== Fauna ===
The Green Bay National Wildlife Refuge provides habitat for many kinds of wildlife, especially birds. The refuge was established first for the purpose of conserving native birds of the Great Lakes Basin. Great blue herons, red-breasted mergansers, and herring gulls are common. Migratory birds breed undisturbed by human presence on the islands. No development has occurred on Hog Island due to its small size, remoteness, and landing difficulties.

Plum Island is open to public use. The local flora provides habitat for birds. Pilot Island provides a safe haven for approximately 3,600 double-crested cormorant nests and about 650 herring gull nests. Black-crowned night herons also find nesting habitat there. Smallmouth bass are commonly found in the waters northwest of Plum and Pilot Islands.

== Wisconsin Islands Wilderness Area ==
In 1964, the United States Congress passed the Wilderness Act of 1964, which created the National Wilderness Preservation System. This bill declared almost 9 million acres (36,000 km^{2}) of land across the United States federal wilderness. In 1970, Hog Island and Gravel Island became one of the smallest areas of land protected by the Wilderness Act, and thus became known as the Wisconsin Islands Wilderness Area.
