= Elk-sedge =

Elk-sedge or elk sedge may refer to:

- Algiz or Eolh-secg (elk-sedge), a rune of the Elder Futhark and Futhorc runic alphabets

== Plants ==
- Carex garberi, a species of sedge native to northern North America.
- Carex geyeri, a species of sedge native to western North America from British Columbia to California to Colorado
- Cladium mariscus, a species of flowering plant in the sedge family native to temperate Europe and Asia
