= La Salle: Expedition II =

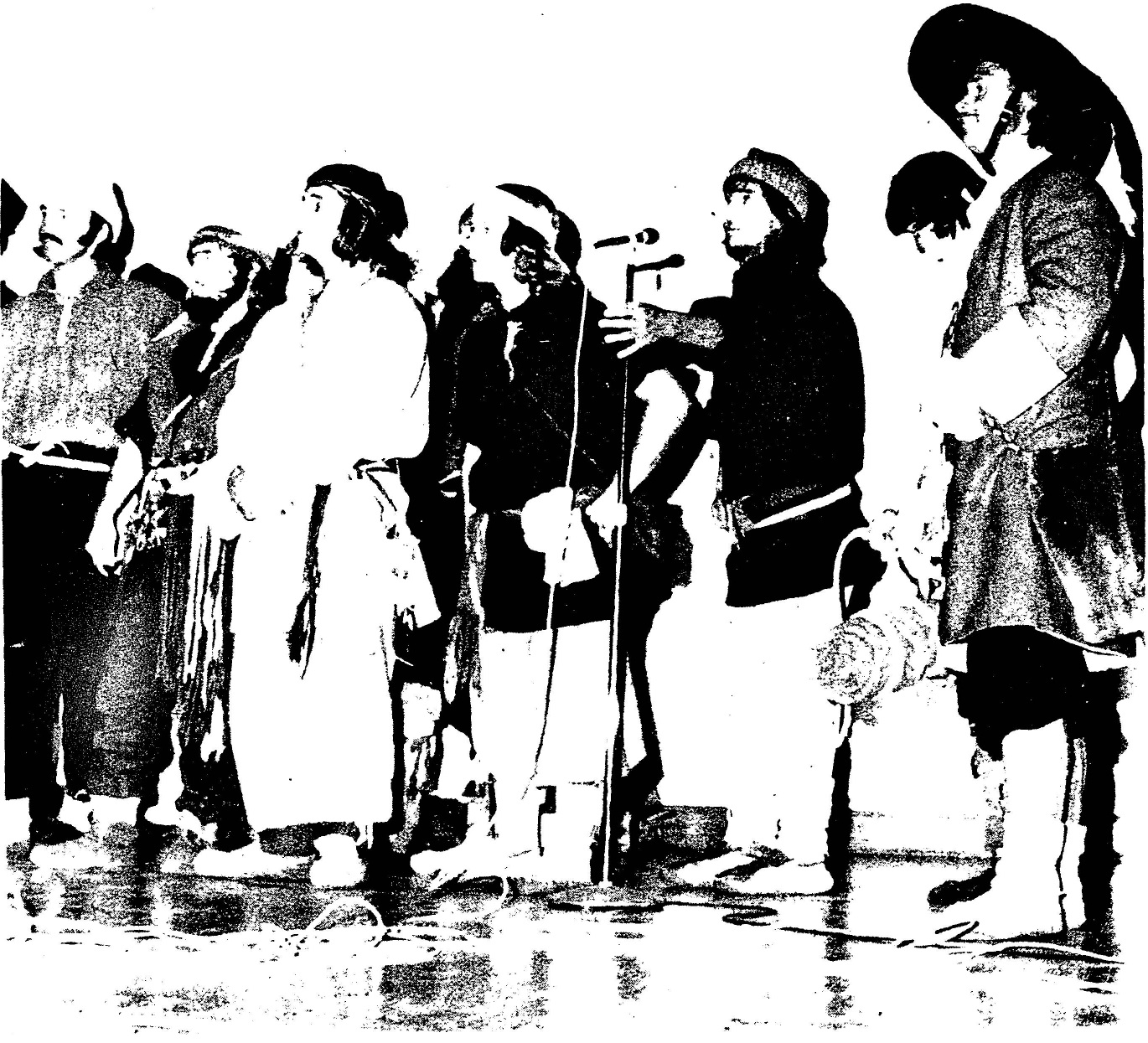
The expedition crewmembers giving a history presentation at Sturgeon Bay Junior High, November 8, 1976. Lewis, representing LaSalle, is on the right.

La Salle: Expedition II was a 1976 bicentennial reenactment of La Salle's original expedition. French teacher Reid Henri Lewis initiated the project, recruiting sixteen Elgin and Larkin High School students and seven adults for the 3300 mile journey.

== Preparation ==
Preparation for this trip began in 1974. Reid Henri Lewis had searched out the correct replicas of canoes of the time which were eventually made by canoe historian Ralph Frese of Chicago. Funding was a major component in this reenactment, along with recreating the clothing to be historically accurate. They also had to ensure they would have the essential supplies for such a journey.

== History ==
The seventeenth century expedition of La Salle was a series of explorations of the Mississippi river starting from the Illinois river tributary to the Gulf of Mexico. It was conducted by René Robert Cavelier, Sieur de La Salle in 1679 through 1682.

== See also ==
- Hog Island (Wisconsin) § La Salle: Expedition II
