= Plum Island Range Lights =

- Location: Plum Island, Door County, United States
- Coordinates: 45°18′29″N 86°57′29″W

Tower
- Constructed: 1896
- Plum Island Range rear light
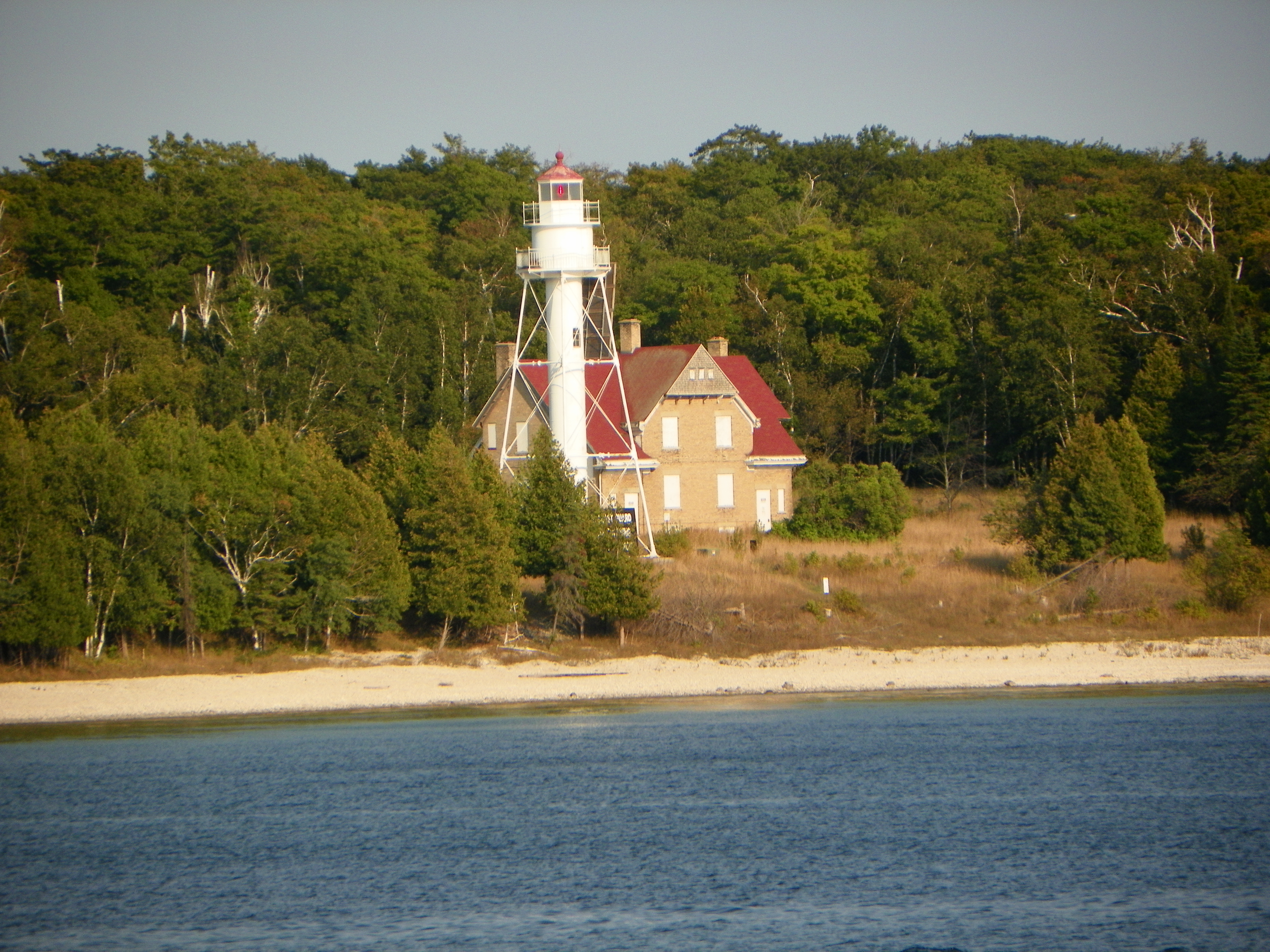
- Rear range light with house
- Constructed: 1896
- Construction: concrete (foundation), iron (tower)
- Automated: 1960s
- Height: 20 m (66 ft)
- Shape: skeletal
- Markings: KRW
- Heritage: National Register of Historic Places listed place
- First lit: 1897
- Focal height: 24 m (79 ft)
- Lens: fourth order Fresnel lens
- Range: 14 nmi (26 km; 16 mi)
- Characteristic: F R
- Plum Island Range Rear Light
- U.S. National Register of Historic Places
- Nearest city: Gills Rock, Wisconsin
- Area: 0.5 acres (0.20 ha)
- MPS: U.S. Coast Guard Lighthouses and Light Stations on the Great Lakes TR
- NRHP reference No.: 84003659
- Added to NRHP: July 19, 1984
- Plum Island Range front light
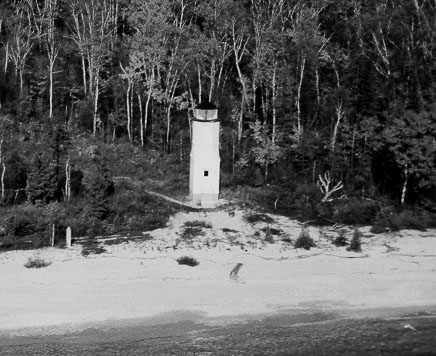
- Archive photo of front range light
- Constructed: 1896
- First lit: 1897

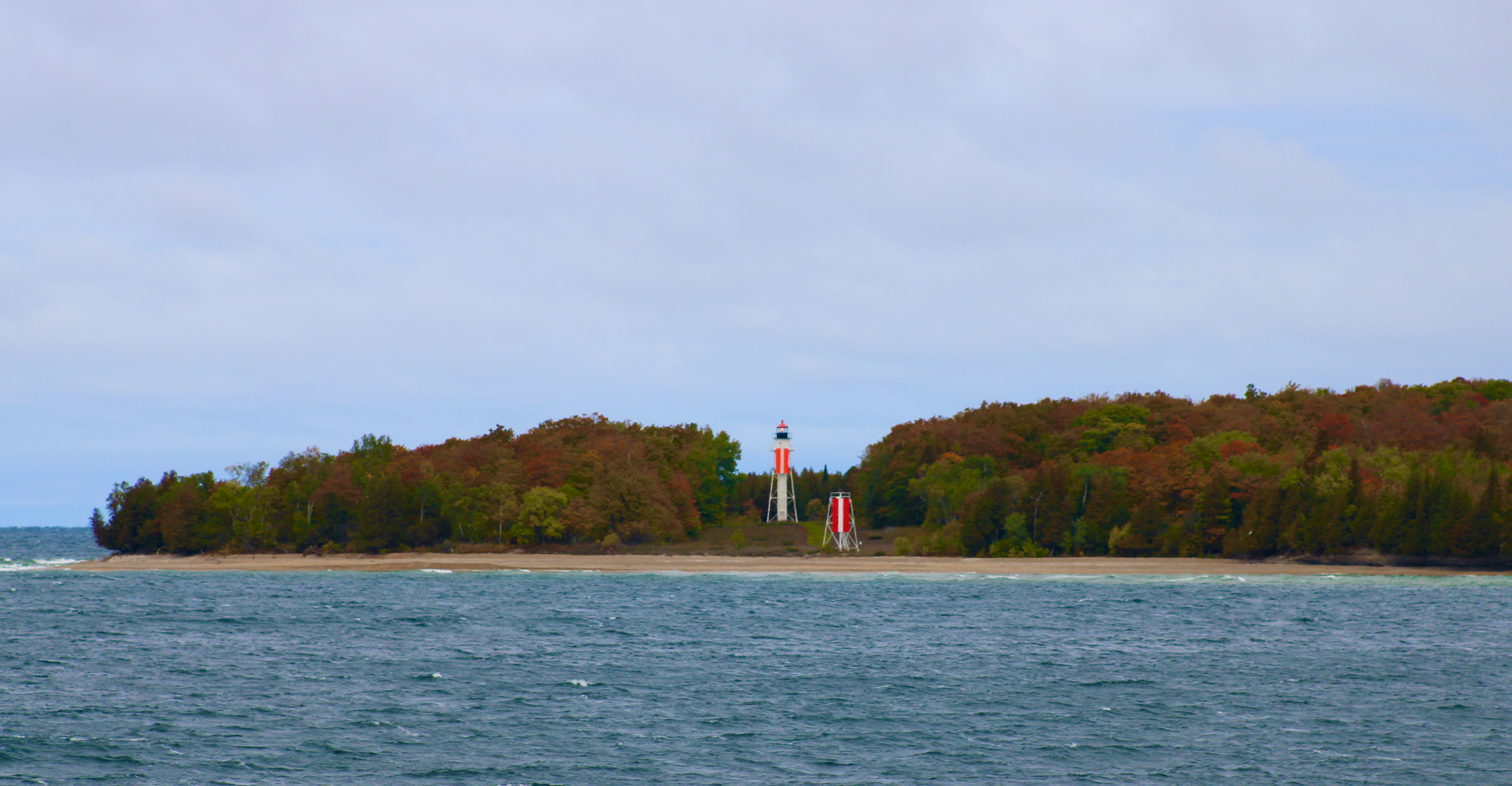
The Plum Island Range Lights are a pair of range lights located on Plum Island in Door County, Wisconsin. Plum Island was transferred to the United States Fish and Wildlife Service in 2007 and became part of the Green Bay National Wildlife Refuge. Plum Island is seasonally open to the public for day-time use.

== History ==
Plum Island is an island at the western shore of Lake Michigan in the southern part of the town of Washington in Door County, Wisconsin, United States. Plum Island is physically located between the mainland of Door County and Washington Island, in the channel known as Death's Door due to the large number of shipwrecks in the channel.

A lighthouse was first built on Plum Island in 1849, but was abandoned in 1858 and the light moved to nearby Pilot Island.

The front and rear range lights were built at the same time as the United States Life-Saving Station that was established on Plum Island in 1895-6, though the two stations would be separately administered until the US Lighthouse Service and USCG merged in 1939. The lights were originally lit in 1897 and are 1,650 feet (500 m) apart, aligned on a 330° bearing line to guide boats safely into the Porte des Morts Passage. The Plum Island front range light was originally identical to the front range light of the Baileys Harbor Range Lights, but was replaced by a modern skeletal light in 1964 and both lights were automated in 1969. The rear range light is the original tower and was added to the National Register of Historic Places in 1984, as the Plum Island Range Rear Light, reference number #84003659. The front light is directional, aligned on 330.5° true. The rear light is omnidirectional and is powered by an LED light. The original 4th order Fresnel lens was removed from the tower in 2015 and is on display at the Death's Door Maritime Museum in Gills Rock, WI.

Nearby Pilot Island and Plum Island were two of four Wisconsin properties turned over by the U.S. Coast Guard to the United States Bureau of Land Management. Large expenses for toxic waste-site environmental remediation were an impediment to transfers and restoration of the Plum Island site. Both islands were finally transferred to the United States Fish and Wildlife Service in 2007 and became part of the Green Bay National Wildlife Refuge. Significant numbers of nesting colonial birds are found on the islands.

The lighthouse keeper's house and Coast Guard station were listed as being among Wisconsin's ten most endangered historic properties in April 2000. All of the maritime structures on Plum Island were listed on the National Register of Historic Places in 2010. The Friends of Plum and Pilot Islands, Inc. have partnered with the United States Fish and Wildlife Service to restore the life-saving station and range lights on Plum Island.

== Getting there ==
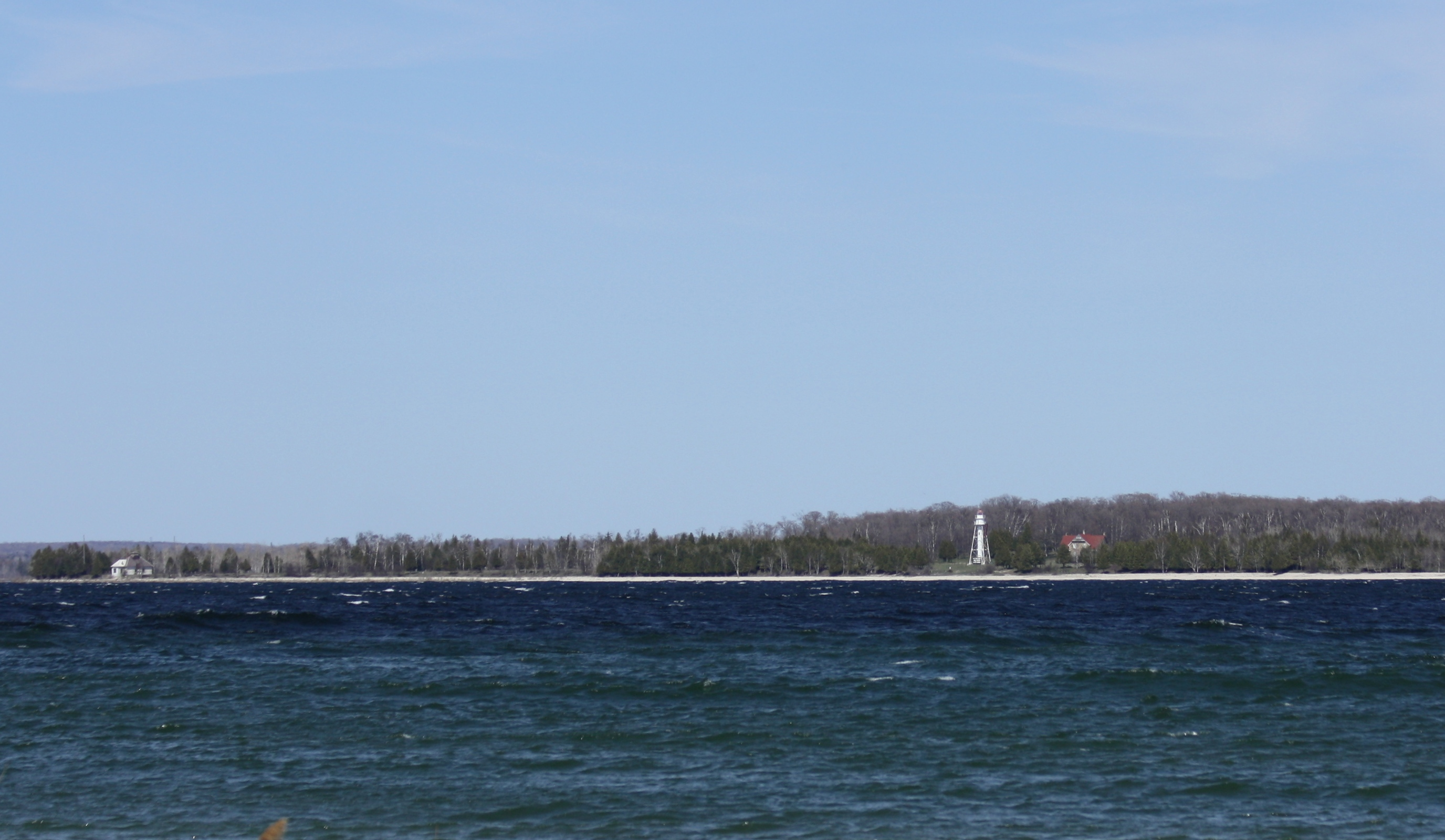
Plum Island

Upon taking control of the island, the United States Fish and Wildlife Service initially closed Plum Island to public access to "ensure necessary protection of ground nesting migratory birds." The island was opened to the public for seasonal day-time use in 2017. The island can be visited by private boat, kayak, or limited ferry from Gills Rock. Multiple hiking trails are available, however, buildings on the island are not generally accessible.
