= Gravel Island National Wildlife Refuge =

Protected area in Wisconsin, United States

- IUCN category IV (habitat/species management area)
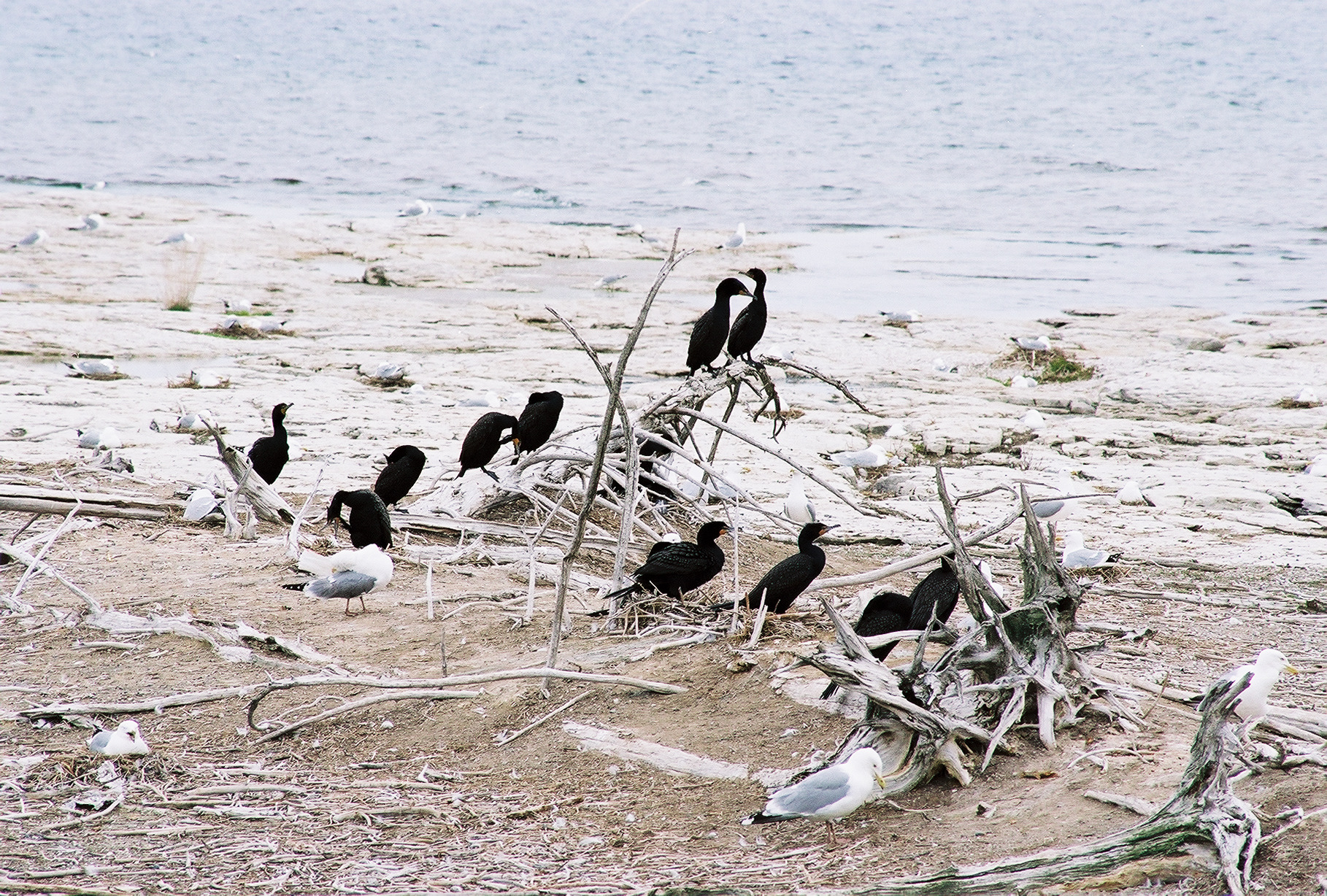
- Birds by the lakeside on Gravel Island.

- Location within Wisconsin Location within the United States
- Location: Liberty Grove, Door County, Wisconsin, United States
- Nearest city: Rowleys Bay
- Coordinates: 45°12′31″N 86°59′41″W
- Area: 28 acres (11 ha)
- Established: 1913
- Governing body: U.S. Fish and Wildlife Service
- Website: Gravel Island National Wildlife Refuge

Gravel Island National Wildlife Refuge is a National Wildlife Refuge located off the Door Peninsula in Wisconsin. Founded in 1913, the refuge consists of two Lake Michigan islands that act as nesting grounds for native bird species. It is inhabited by large colonies of shore birds and waterfowl in addition to hosting a pair of great black-backed gulls, one of farthest westward breeding sites of the species.

== History ==
In the years before the refuge's founding, multiple expeditions were made to the islands. Ornithologist Henry L. Ward, then-curator of the Milwaukee Public Museum, visited the area numerous times to study the herring gull populations. While visiting Gravel Island in 1906 and 1907, Ward noted very large colonies of herring gulls as well as Caspian terns while observing their behavior and collecting specimens from the island. In 1913, the refuge was formed by executive order from Gravel Island and Spider Island to protect the breeding grounds of birds living there. Upon its formation it became the 29th refuge in the United States and third in the Great Lakes region. In 1970 the refuge became part of the Wisconsin Islands Wilderness Area, one of the smallest in the country. Many studies have been performed at the refuge since the 1970s, and recent efforts have focused on tagging of the birds and studying their migration habits and breeding.

In 2009 the refuge became part of a Comprehensive Conservation Planning (CCP) program which will help manage the refuge more efficiently. The plan is intended to provide long-term continuity in refuge management, ensure that the refuge is consistent with the policies of the National Wildlife Refuge System, and improve budgets for the refuge.

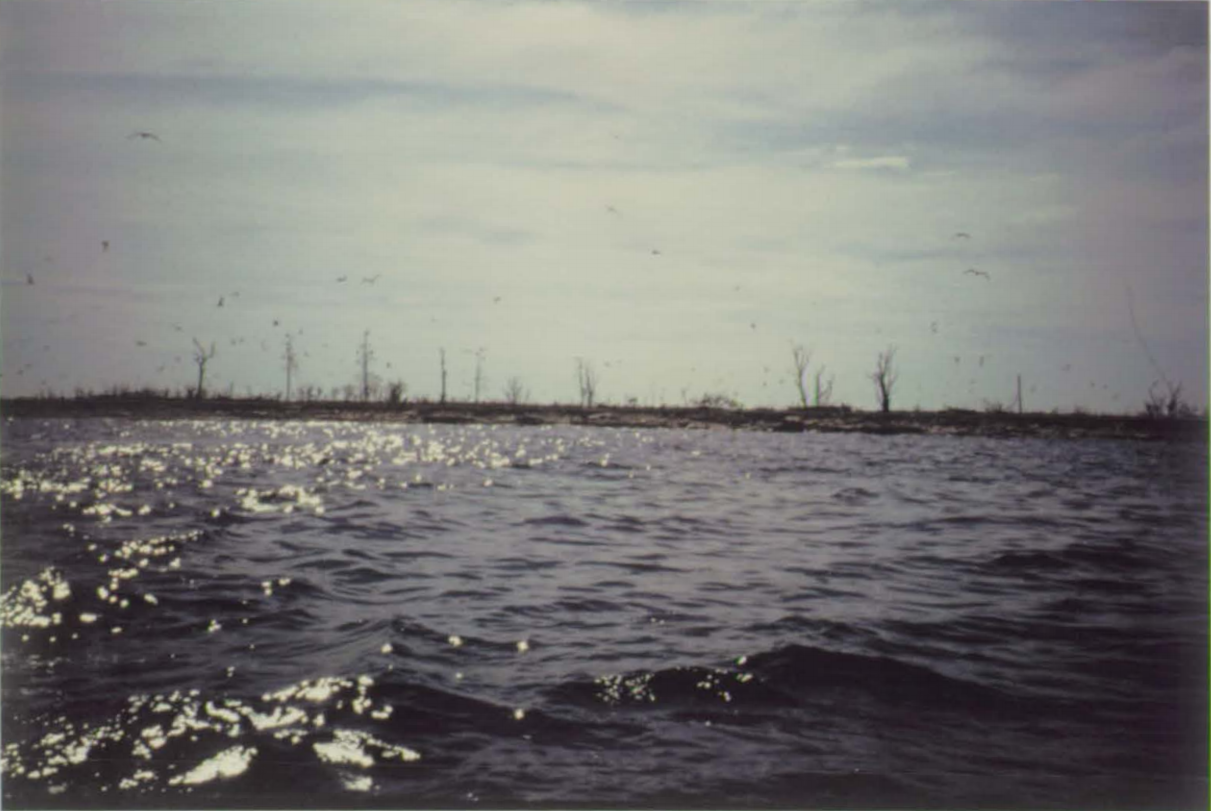
Spider Island, June 1994

The refuge is part of the Wisconsin Islands Wilderness Area, and as such it is off-limits to the public to preserve the habitat of the islands, Although presently the islands are off-limits, an earlier plan for the islands was different. John Gottschalk, the Director of the Bureau of Sport Fisheries and Wildlife, testified in 1969 before a joint meeting of several U.S. House subcommittees that out of a group of six lake islands to be designated as the Wisconsin Islands Wilderness and Michigan Islands Wilderness, five of them would be open to the public.

== Geography and geology ==
The refuge covers 28 acres (11 ha) divided between two islands: Spider Island, spanning 23 acres (9.3 ha), and Gravel Island at a size of 4 acres (1.6 ha). The refuge is located off the east side of the Door Peninsula in Lake Michigan near Porte des Morts or "Death's Door", and is in a geographically rugged part of the Niagara Escarpment. The islands are composed primarily of limestone, with little to no vegetation growing on them. They were shaped by years of receding water, powerful pre-glacial rivers, and advancing glaciers. As a result, the islands are mainly flat and rise only a few yards above the lake.

== Wildlife and ecology ==
=== Flora ===
Spider Island had a birch-cedar-tamarack forest until the late 1970s, but succumbed to the thousands of birds living on the island. The trees of Spider island have now fallen over or been washed away and no permanent vegetation is known on Gravel Island.

=== Fauna ===
The refuge is home for to a wide array of bird species that either use the islands as nesting grounds or as a place of shelter. The great black-backed gull (Larus marinus) is known to have a small breeding colony on Gravel Island, and historically on Spider Island. In 1994 the species was discovered on Spider Island, making it the westernmost breeding on record at the time. Large colonies of herring gulls (Larus smithsonianus) and double-crested cormorants (Phalacrocorax auritus) are found on both islands, while a colony of Caspian terns (Sterna caspia) can be found on Gravel Island. Scattered populations of waterfowl nest on Spider Island; these include the Canada goose (Branta canadensis), American black duck (Anas rubripes) and mallard (Anas platyrhynchos).

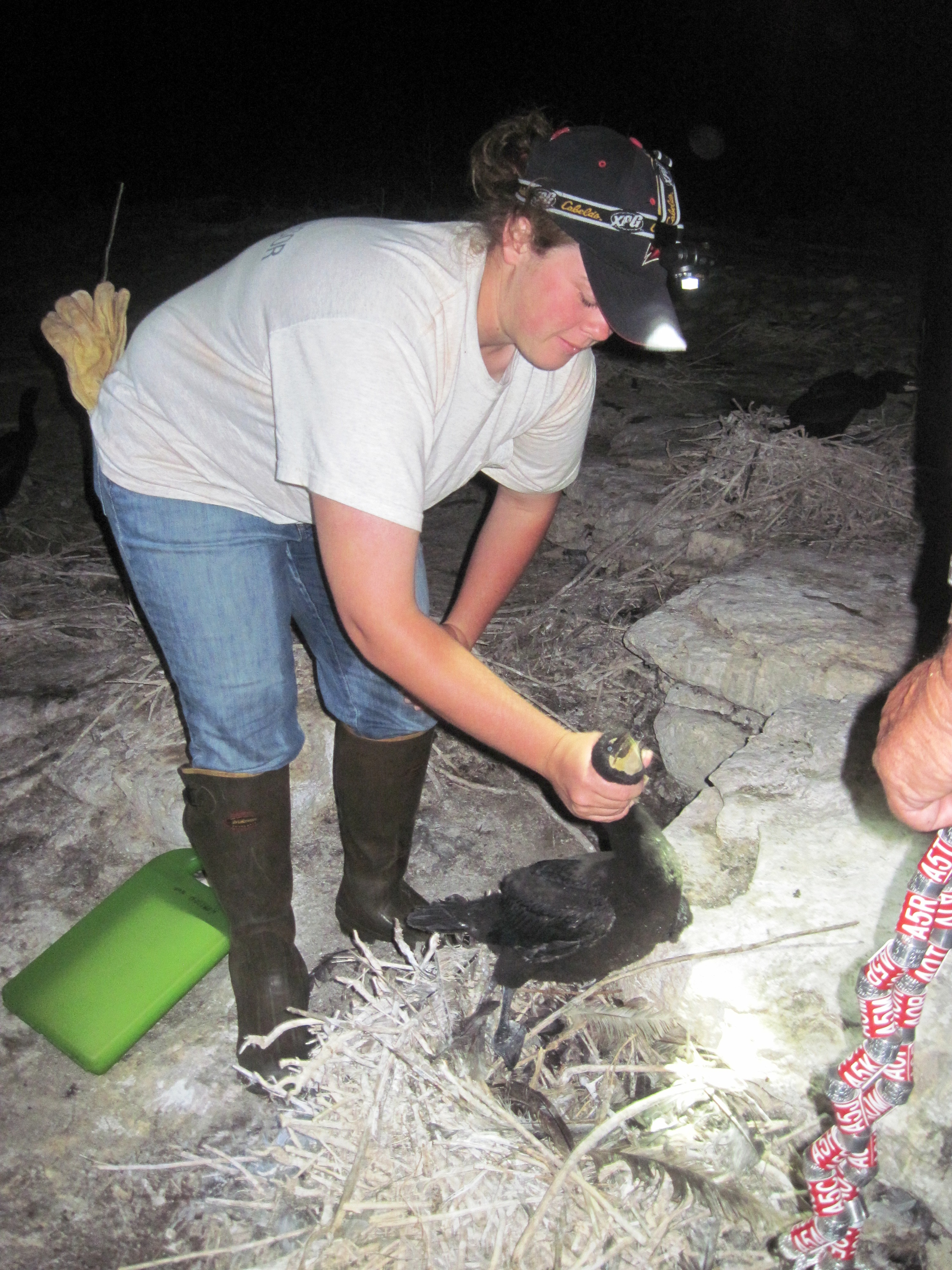
In 2011, 1,000 double-crested cormorant chicks were banded. As an intern, Mandy was the first to take hold of a sleepy chick. Everything was done at night so that the chicks would be sleeping and less aware.
