= Spider Island (Wisconsin) =

Uninhabited island in Lake Michigan

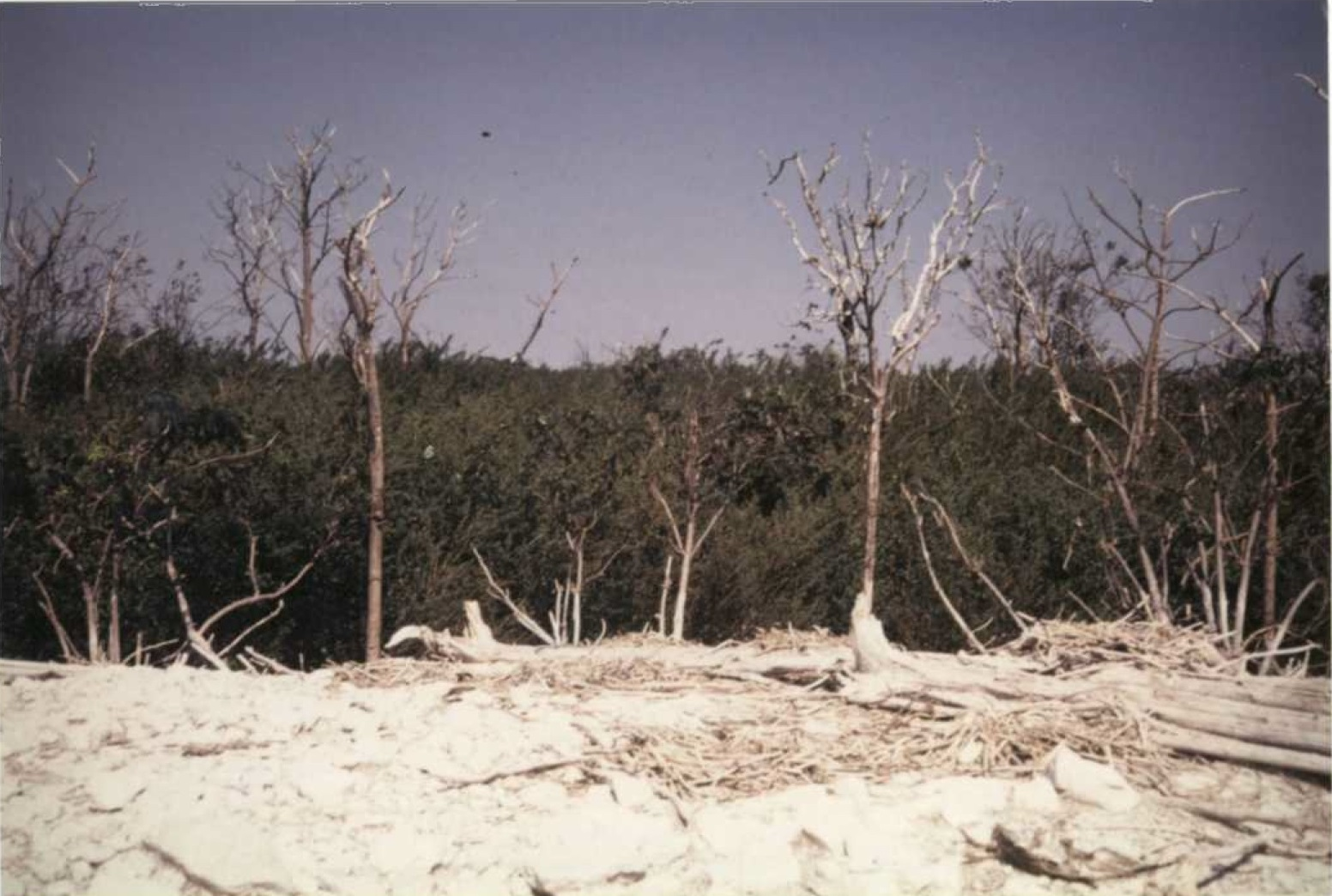
- The island in September 1987

- Location within Wisconsin Location within the United States

Geography
- Location: Door County, Wisconsin
- Coordinates: 45°12′34″N 86°58′33″W
- Area: 23 acres (9.3 ha)
- Highest elevation: 587 ft (178.9 m)

Administration
- United States
- State: Wisconsin
- County: Door County
- Town: Liberty Grove

Spider Island is an uninhabited island in Lake Michigan. It is located in Ellison Bay, in the town of Liberty Grove, Wisconsin. The Gravel Island National Wildlife Refuge is made up of Spider Island, and nearby Gravel Island. At 23 acres (9.3 ha) it is the larger of the two islands.
