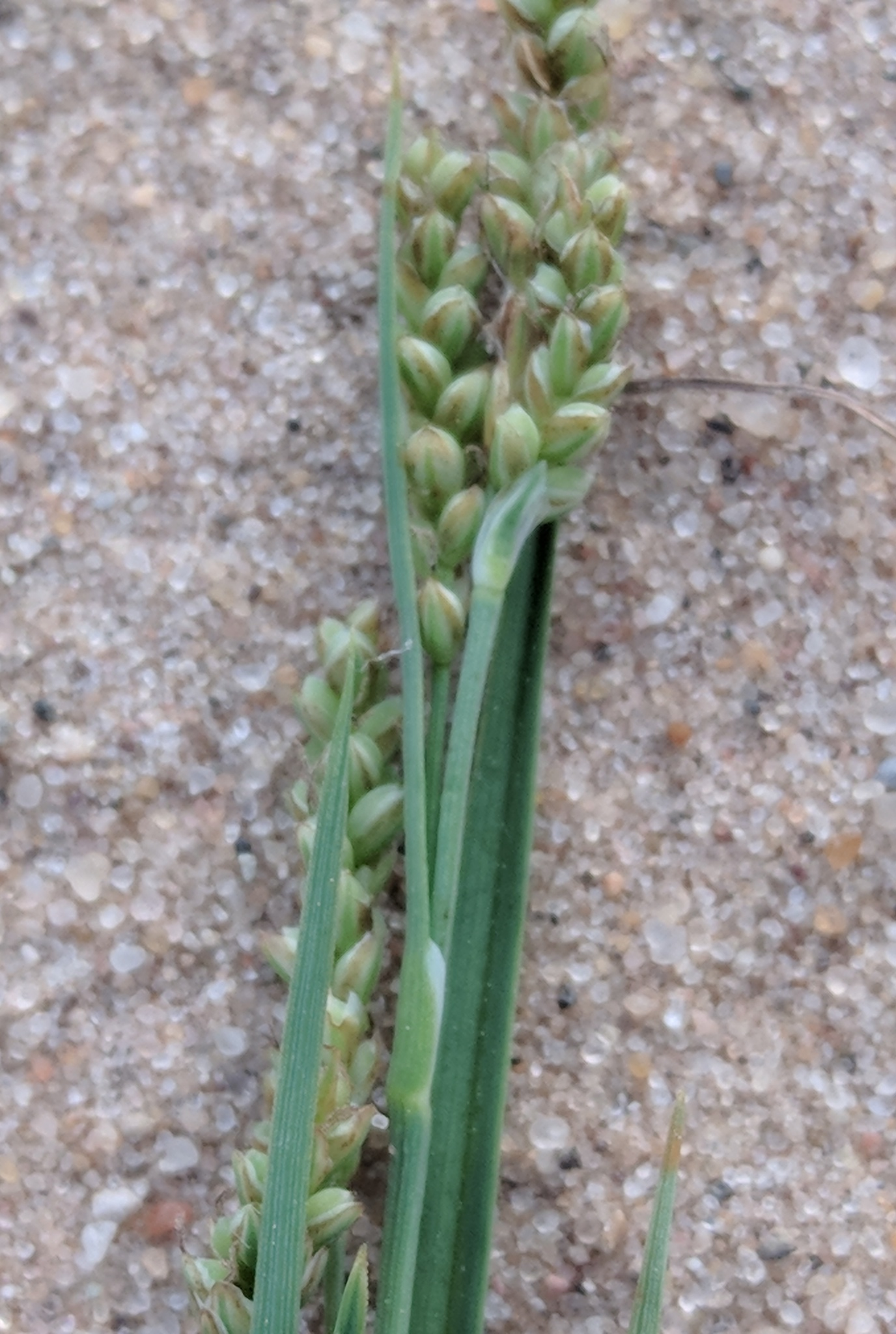

Conservation status
- Secure (NatureServe)

Scientific classification
- Kingdom: Plantae
- Clade: Tracheophytes
- Clade: Angiosperms
- Clade: Monocots
- Clade: Commelinids
- Order: Poales
- Family: Cyperaceae
- Genus: Carex
- Species: C. garberi

Binomial name
- Carex garberi Fernald

= Carex garberi =

Species of grass-like plant

Carex garberi, commonly known as elk sedge and Garber's sedge, is a species of sedge native to North America.

== Distribution ==
It is native to northern North America, where it occurs throughout Canada and Alaska and at higher elevations as far south as the San Francisco Bay Area of California.

== Description ==
This sedge produces loose clumps of stems estimated as up to 40 or even 70 centimeters tall. The leaves may be shorter or much taller than the stems, but are only a few millimeters wide. There are inflorescences at the tips and along the sides of the stem; the lateral ones are pistillate, while the terminal ones usually have both male and female flowers. The scales covering the flowers are brown with a pale stripe through the midline.

This sedge grows in many types of forests and meadows, usually in wet places such as swamps or pools. It is common around the Great Lakes.
