= Gravel Island (Wisconsin) =

Island in Wisconsin, United States

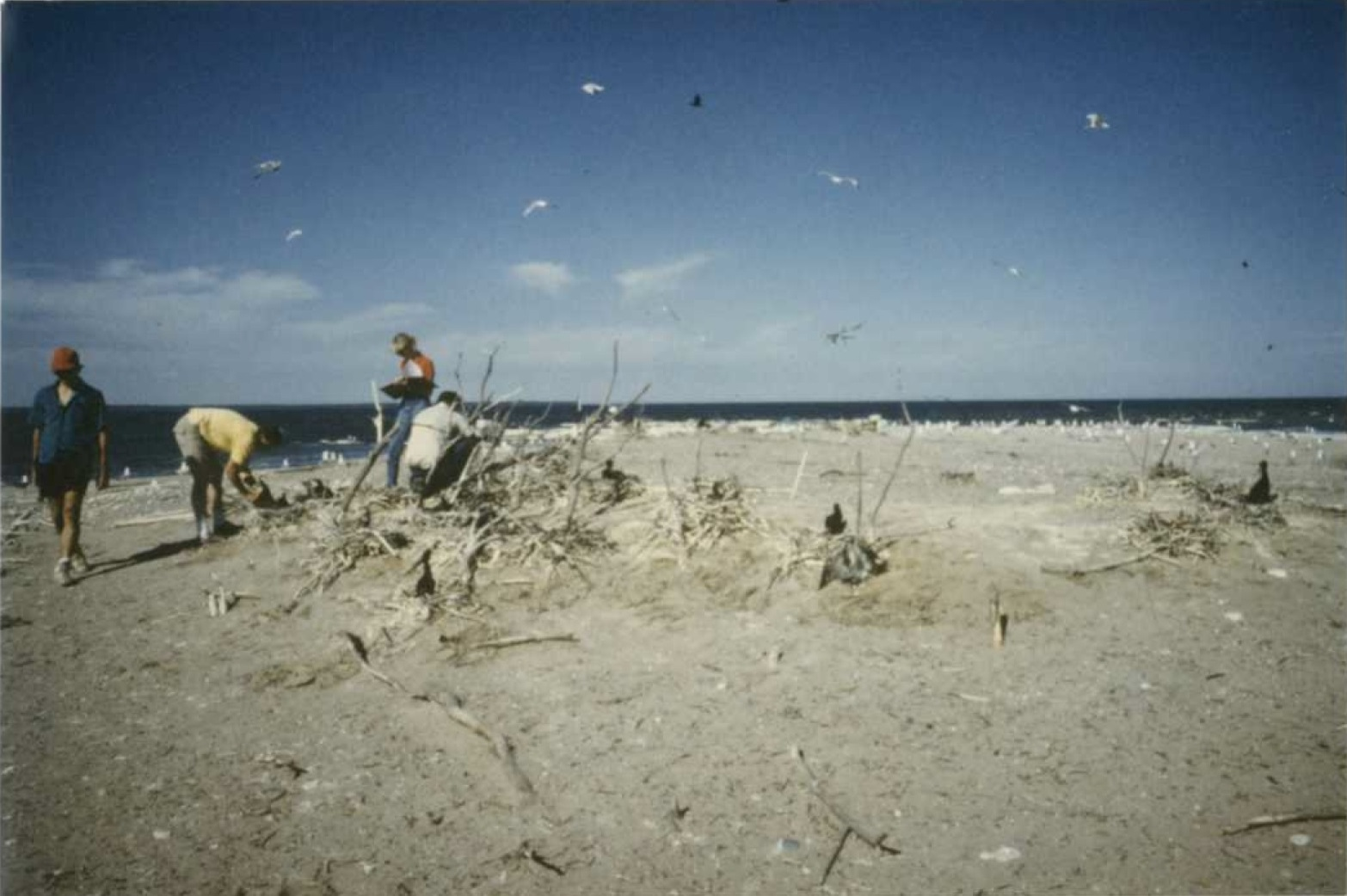
- Ecological Services crew banding on Gravel Island, 1988

- Location within Wisconsin Location within the United States

Geography
- Location: Door County, Wisconsin
- Coordinates: 45°15′13″N 86°57′46″W
- Area: 4 acres (1.6 ha)
- Highest elevation: 581 ft (177.1 m)

Administration
- United States
- State: Wisconsin
- County: Door County
- Town: Liberty Grove

Gravel Island is an island in Lake Michigan. It is located in Ellison Bay, in the town of Liberty Grove, Wisconsin. The Gravel Island National Wildlife Refuge is made up of Gravel Island, and nearby Spider Island. The island is uninhabited, and a botanist who visited in 1999 was unable to find any vascular plants on the island.

In 2022, a large number of dead Caspian terns were found on Gravel Island, which were part of a larger die-off on Lake Michigan islands due to avian influenza.

== Native American name ==
A Native American name for the island is Mah-ko-me-ne-shine-me-nis or "Bear Island". A legend published in the early 1900s relates an incident four hundred years prior where a spirit bear was seen crossing the lake from the east shore. The Potawatomi beckoned him ashore. Since then they call the island Old Bear Cub island.

== Climate ==
Gravel Island

Climate chart (precipitation, max. and min. temperature)
| J | F | M | A | M | J | J | A | S | O | N | D |
| 66 −4 −9 | 60 −8 −10 | 62 0 −4 | 112 3 0 | 86 9 3 | 77 13 10 | 96 18 16 | 73 19 16 | 109 17 14 | 119 10 7 | 110 6 5 | 66 4 1 |
- █ Average max. and min. temperatures in °C
- █ Precipitation totals in mm
Imperial conversion
| J | F | M | A | M | J | J | A | S | O | N | D |
| 2.6 25 16 | 2.4 18 14 | 2.4 32 25 | 4.4 37 32 | 3.4 48 37 | 3 55 50 | 3.8 64 61 | 2.9 66 61 | 4.3 63 57 | 4.7 50 45 | 4.3 43 41 | 2.6 39 34 |
- █ Average max. and min. temperatures in °F
- █ Precipitation totals in inches
