= Peninsula State Park =

State park in Door County, Wisconsin

- Aerial view; Fish Creek is the developed area on the left

- Location within Wisconsin Location within the United States
- Interactive map of Peninsula State Park
- Location: Door County, Wisconsin, United States
- Coordinates: 45°9′4″N 87°13′3″W
- Area: 3,776 acres (1,528 ha)
- Established: 1910
- Administrator: Wisconsin Department of Natural Resources
- Visitors: 1,148,482 (DNR est.) (in 2024)
- Website: Official website
- Wisconsin State Parks

Peninsula State Park is a 3,776-acre (1,528 ha) Wisconsin state park with eight miles (13 km) of Green Bay shoreline in Door County. Peninsula is the third largest state park in Wisconsin and is visited by an estimated one million visitors annually.

== History ==
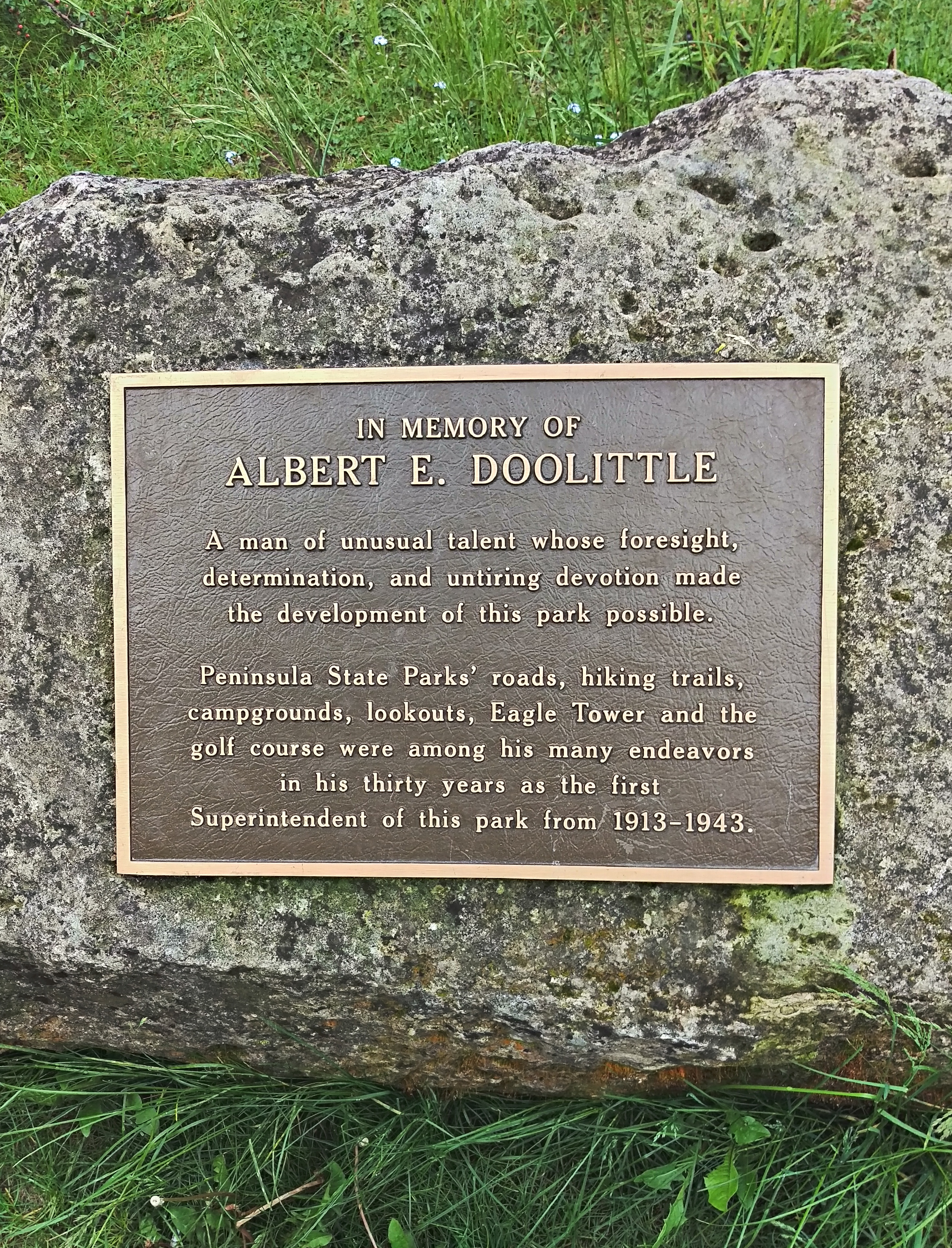
Memorial plaque about Doolittle

In May 1908, members of the Wisconsin State Park Board visited Door County to look for an area to develop a state park. Town chairmen in the county were asked to come up with possible tracts and prices for the board. Individuals could also advocate where they thought the new park should be. Baileys Harbor and Jacksonport offered the state a tract of over 1,000 acres spanning the shores of Kangaroo Lake and Lake Michigan. Other proposed locations considered by the board members were located at Clarks Lake in Sevastopol, Ellison Bay, Gills Rock, and Europe Bay. Two locations in the vicinity of Fish Creek were shown to the park board. One tract was south of the community and included the bluffs, and the other was north of the village, on the point between Fish Creek and Ephraim and also included bluffs. In addition to viewing these from the land, the board members were taken on a gasoline-powered boat ride to view the high limestone bluffs from the water. A large number of photographs were taken at various places of unusual beauty. John Nolen recommended the present-day site near Fish Creek to the board.

Peninsula State Park was established in 1909. Land was acquired for an average of $20 per acre. The state legislature officially established Peninsula as a state park in 1910, making it the second state park in Wisconsin. The primary purpose of building a state park in the northern part of Door County was to afford a playground and resting place for those whose financial conditions and locations precluded the possibility of owning summer cottages. The park was originally free and did not charge admission in order to achieve the purpose of keeping visitors' expenses to a minimum, so that toilers would be permitted to share in the pleasure and benefits of outdoor life. With a budget of less than $2,000 per year, work on the park proceeded slowly. Early projects included miles of roads, scenic lookouts, campgrounds, two towers, and initial portions of two golf courses. During the 1919 season, which marked the end of Peninsula's first decade, an estimated twenty-thousand people visited Peninsula. Around this time, Doolittle established Door County Days, a summer picnic with music and sports events attended by thousands. Peninsula was becoming a premier outdoor playground in the Midwest.

A Civilian Conservation Corps camp was established at Peninsula State Park during the Great Depression. The crews built roads and removed dead wood. Jens Jensen objected to this, and stated that the purpose of such a park was "first of all, a place different from the man made world where man may find and enjoy and study the work of the Great Master. It is also, or should be, a natural monument of outstanding character in the landscape." In the summer of 1945, Fish Creek was the site of a German POW camp, under an affiliation with a base camp at Fort Sheridan, Illinois. The prisoners engaged in construction projects, cut wood, and picked cherries in the park and surrounding area.

In 1982, Sunset Bike Trail was surfaced, computers began to be used for reservations, and an irrigation system was installed on the golf course. In 1992 the first deer hunt was held on the park grounds. In 2001, tree thinning was started and eventually completed in Tennison Bay. The park celebrated its Centennial in 2009.

== Points of interest ==
Considered Wisconsin's most complete park, Peninsula has 468 campsites, three group camps, a summer theater, an 18-hole golf course, sand beach, biking, hiking and ski trails, 150-foot bluffs, a lighthouse and eight miles of Door County shoreline. The park is open year-round but some features may not be accessible outside the peak season.

=== Eagle Bluff Light ===
The Eagle Bluff Light, also known as Eagle Bluff Lighthouse, is a lighthouse located near Fish Creek in Peninsula State Park in Door County, Wisconsin. Construction was authorized in 1866 by President Andrew Johnson, but the lighthouse was not actually built until 1868, at a cost of $12,000. It was automated in 1926. The former lighthouse keeper's home has been a museum since 1963. Park admission and a donation is required to tour the lighthouse.

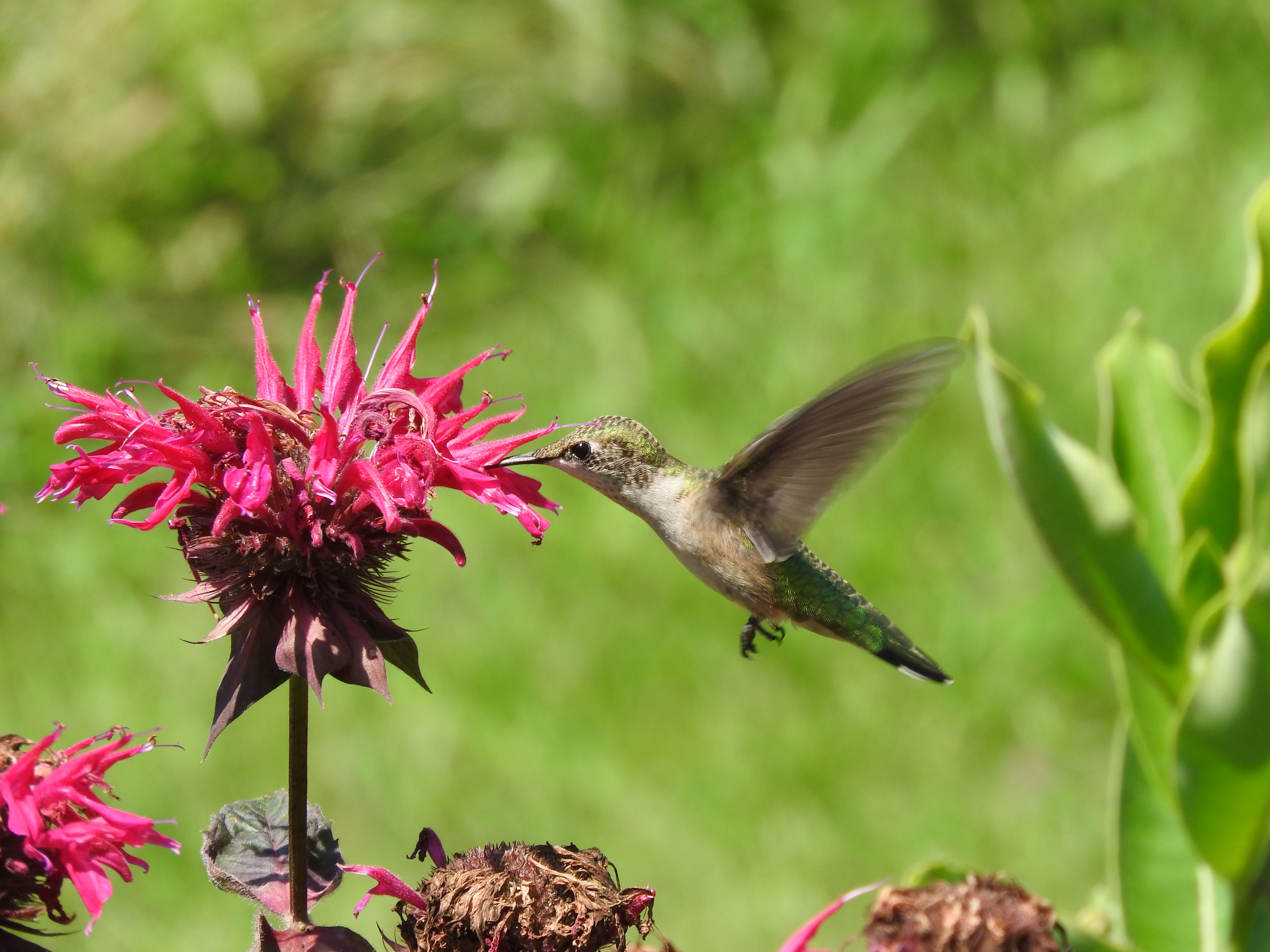
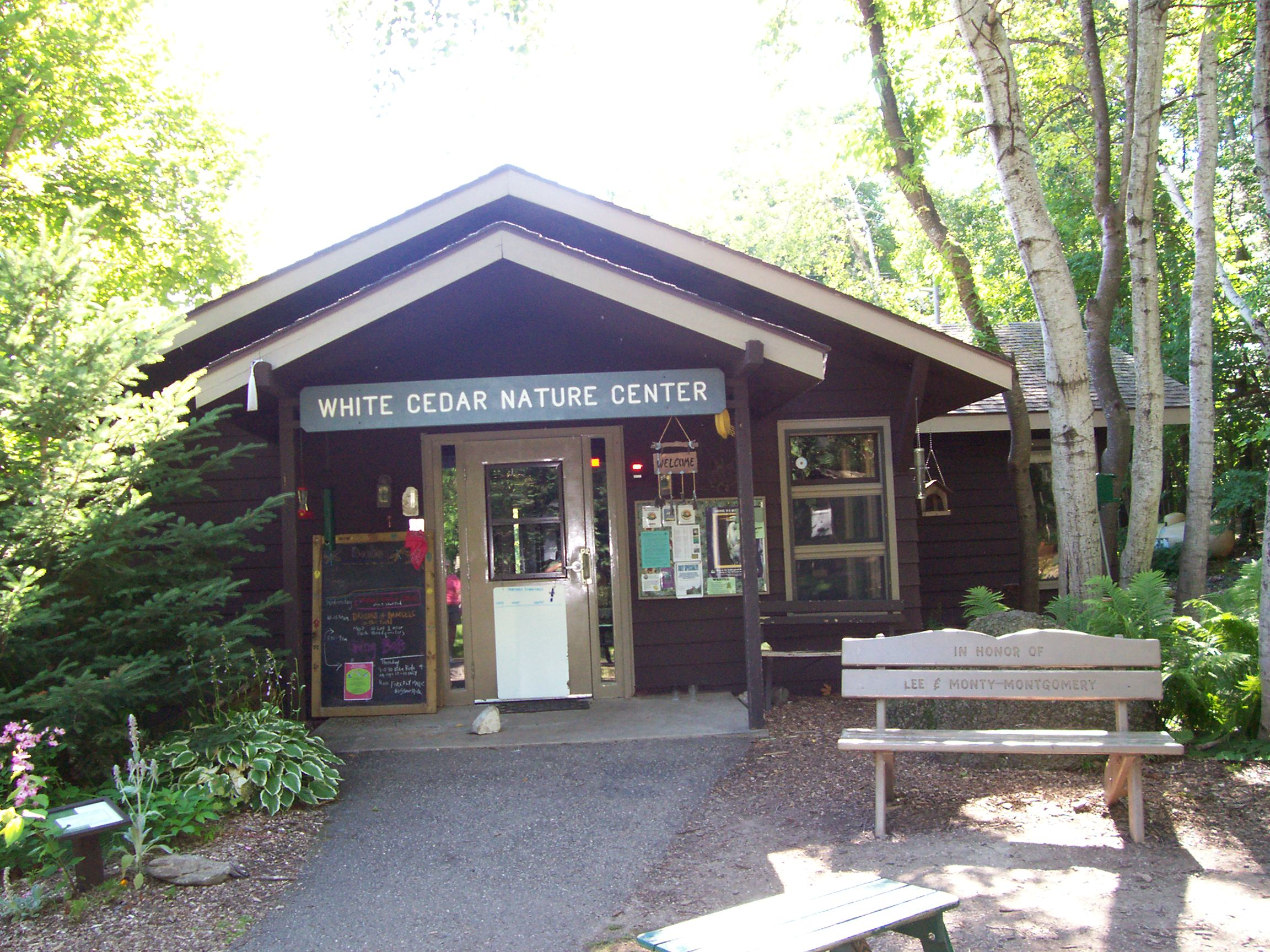
Ruby-throated hummingbird (left) feeding on a bergamot flower outside the White Cedar Nature Center (right)

=== White Cedar Nature Center ===
The White Cedar Nature Center features a display of mounted animals, as well as historic photos and artifacts, and a large diorama of the park. The building was constructed in 1939 as a winter warming house for the nearby ski jump and toboggan run, both abandoned in the 1940s. The nature center offers education programs including hikes, campfire talks and nature crafts year-round.

=== Eagle Tower ===
Eagle Tower was a 76-foot (23 m) observation tower located atop the 180-foot (55 m) limestone Eagle Bluff. The tower offered views of the park, surrounding islands, and the Michigan shoreline. The most recent tower was built in 1932 to replace the original tower built on Eagle Bluff in 1914. Another tower stood in the park at Sven's Bluff from 1914 to 1947 but was dismantled due to poor condition and never replaced. The Eagle Tower closed September 9, 2015, as a result of disrepair. A new tower was constructed. It features a handicap accessible ramp from the bluff and at 60-foot (18 m) high it is somewhat shorter than the original tower.

Hjalmar Holand's lot line ran 200 feet west of where Eagle Tower is today. In 1911 he moved and the area was added to the park.

=== Northern Sky Theater ===
Northern Sky Theater (Formerly American Folklore Theatre) is located within Peninsula State Park. Original musical comedies are performed Monday through Saturday nights during the summer. Over fifty thousand people attend the musicals each year.

=== Horseshoe Island ===
Horseshoe Island is part of the park and is the only nearby island owned by the state. Located in Green Bay, the island is accessible by private boat. It has no establishments other than a pit toilet, a hiking trail and the foundations of buildings once occupied by the Folda family in the 1890s. The French explorer Jean Nicolet reportedly landed briefly on the island.

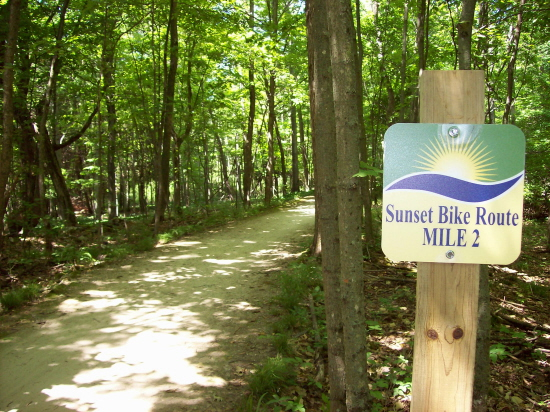
Sunset Bike Route

=== Sunset Bike Trail ===
Sunset Bike Trail is a 5.1-mile (8.2 km) paved/gravel trail that snakes through Peninsula's hardwoods and marshes. The entire route is 9.5 miles (15.3 km) and takes about one hour to bike and three hours to hike. Sunset Bike Trail provides a safe and scenic alternative to Shore Road for bikers and hikers. Riders are not required to have a Wisconsin State Trail Pass.

=== Two golf courses ===
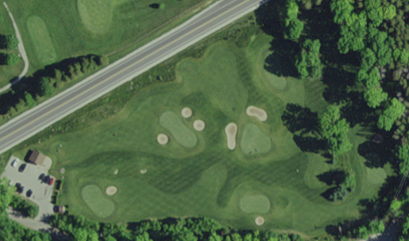
The six-hole short course

The non-profit Peninsula Golf Associates operate the park's 18-hole Peninsula Golf Course, considered to be one of the most scenic in Wisconsin.

What is now the Peninsula Golf Course began in 1913 as two proposed nine-hole courses, one near the Fish Creek park entrance and the other at the present site. Planning and work began slowly since money was tight and water was a problem. After a few years, the Fish Creek site was abandoned. In 1921 The Door County Country Club opened for play as a six-hole golf course, functioning with “sand and oil” greens during its first ten years. By 1926, three more holes had been developed, one of which was the 65-yard, over the bluff, par three that has been the signature hole ever since. During the next few years, the final nine were constructed, and by 1931 an 18-hole golf course measuring 5,000 yards was ready to play. In the 1960s, the course was lengthened and redesigned.

In 2013, plans for a 6-hole short course were approved in order to educate new golfers. The short course was completed and opened in 2014.

=== Wetlands ===
Weborg Marsh is a ten-acre spring-fed marsh along Shore Road in the southwest corner of the park. This area has a muck bottom and abundant aquatic vegetation. Two outlets to Green Bay under Shore Road provide water interchange with Green Bay and varying water depths in the marsh due to seiche and wind direction.

Cedar Swamp is located south of the former sewage lagoon near Tennison Bay. Some standing water remains in the swamp year round.

== Campgrounds ==
Peninsula State Park has 468 family campsites and three group camp sites. All campgrounds have flush toilet and shower facilities.

In 1977, 47 species of birds were counted in the forests and campgrounds of the park, but no more than 26 species were found in any particular habitat type.

=== Nicolet Bay ===
Nicolet Bay is divided into two parts, North and South. The Nicolet Bay camping area has one-hundred and eighty-eight campsites sites, thirty-three of which have electricity. There are shower/flush toilet buildings throughout the campground. The park's sandy swimming beach—popular with campers and very crowded during warm summer days—is located at Nicolet Bay. The Camp Store, Boats and Bikes Rentals, Snack Bar, and boat launch at Nicolet Bay are open seasonally.

=== Tennison Bay ===
Tennison Bay is the largest campground in the park; it has one-hundred and eighty-eight campsites, fifty-six of which are electric. Tennison has two shower/bathroom facilities and three flush toilet facilities (without showers). There is a playground and kayak launch at the north end of the campground. Tennison is the only campground open year-round.

=== Weborg Point ===
Weborg is Peninsula's smallest campground, with twelve electric sites and one shower/toilet building. These sites are popular with RV and trailer campers. Weborg is near the park's Fish Creek entrance and has views of downtown Fish Creek. A concrete pier at the tip of Weborg Point is popular with recreational fishermen. The Weborg Point shelter is available for reservations.

=== Welcker's Point ===
Welcker's Point is an eighty-one-site non-electric campground located at the northern peninsula of the park. Welcker's is popular among campers with tents and small trailers because of the heavily wooded nature of the surrounding forest. It is also at the head of many hiking and biking trails (including a path to Nicolet Beach) and has a reservable shelter just outside the campground, which is a popular place for visitors to view bats 30 minutes after sunset during summer evenings.

=== Views from or near the campgrounds ===
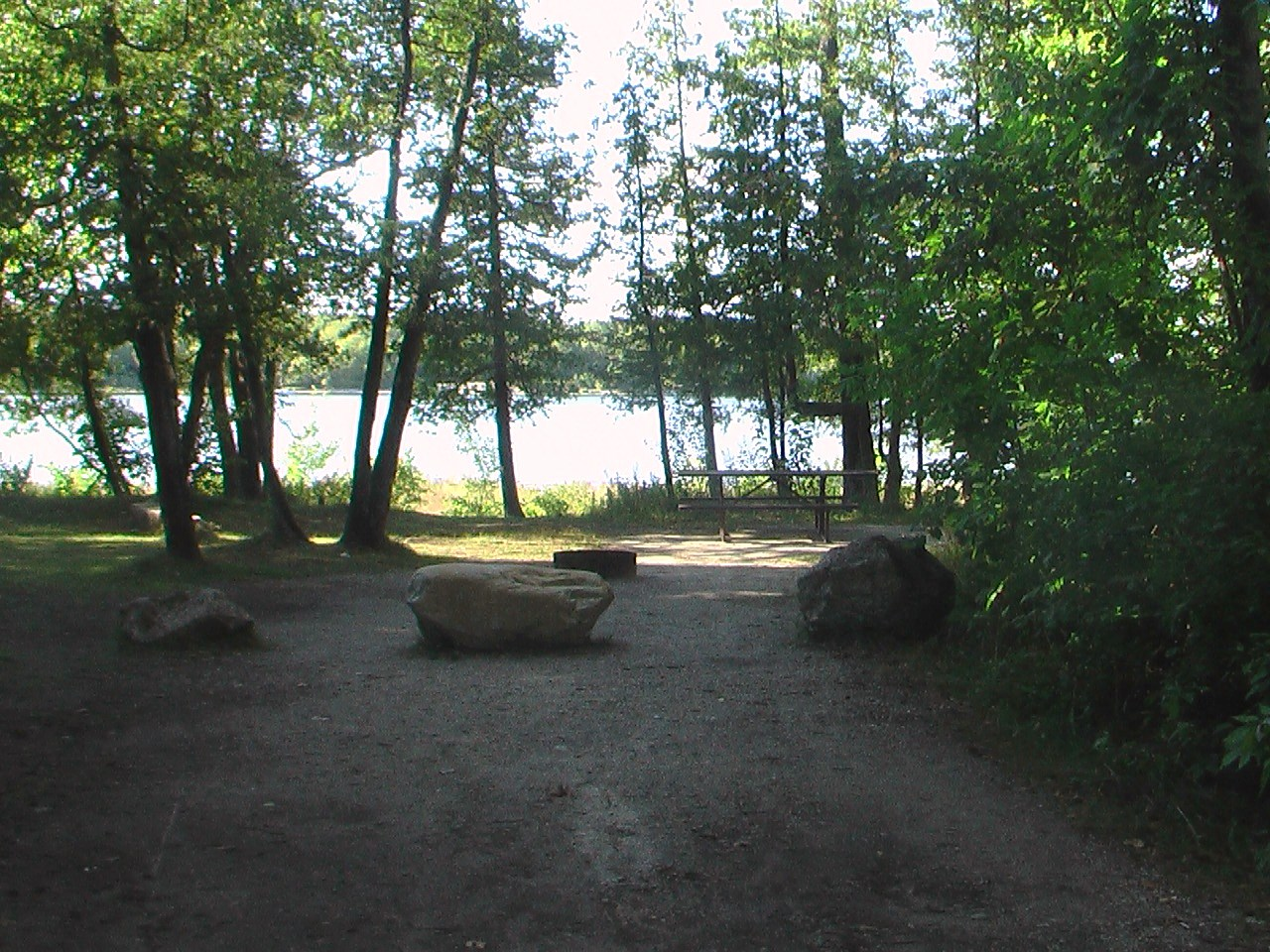
Campsite 860

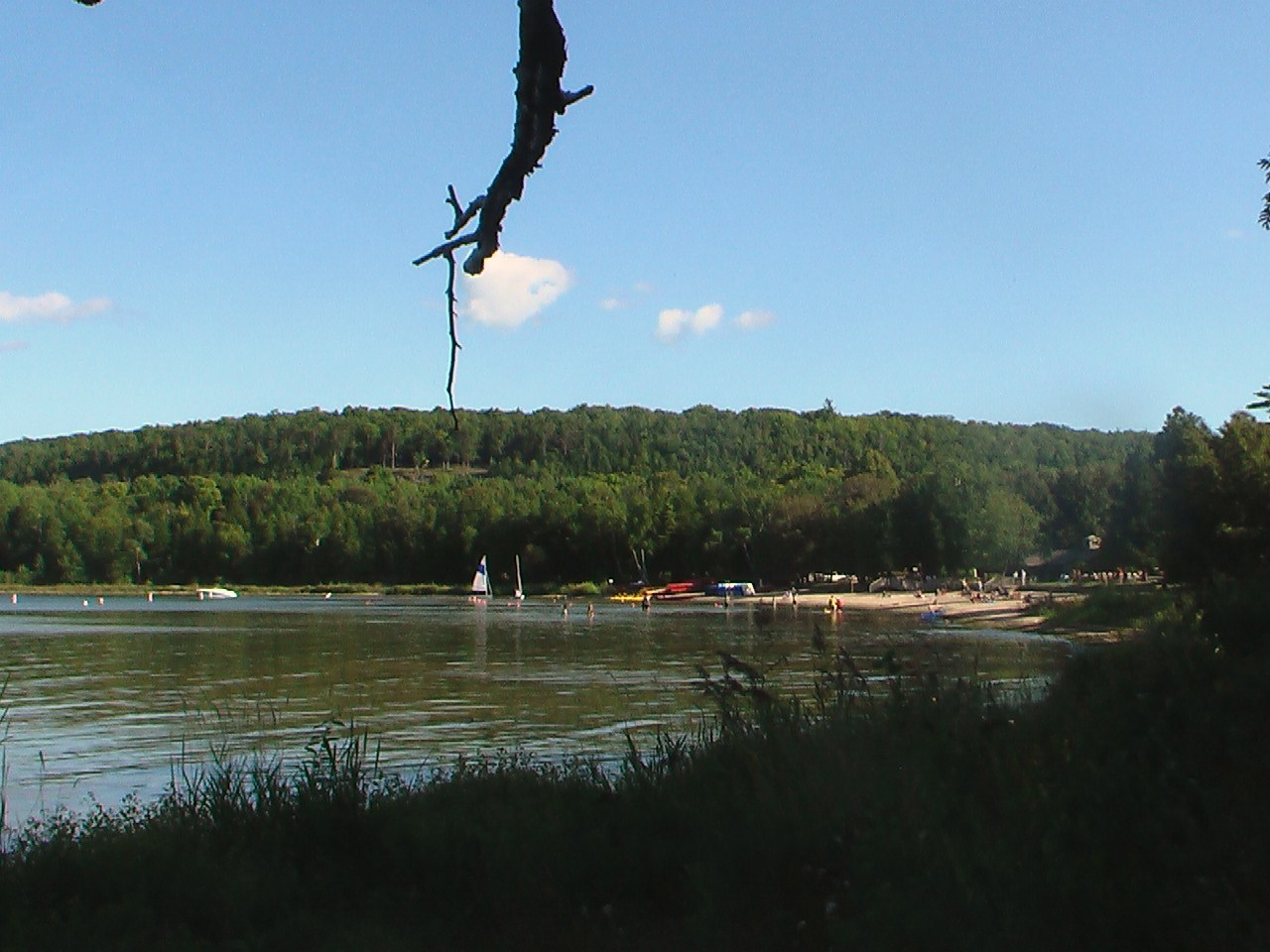
Nicolet Bay Beach, as viewed from the trail behind Site 616 on August 31st

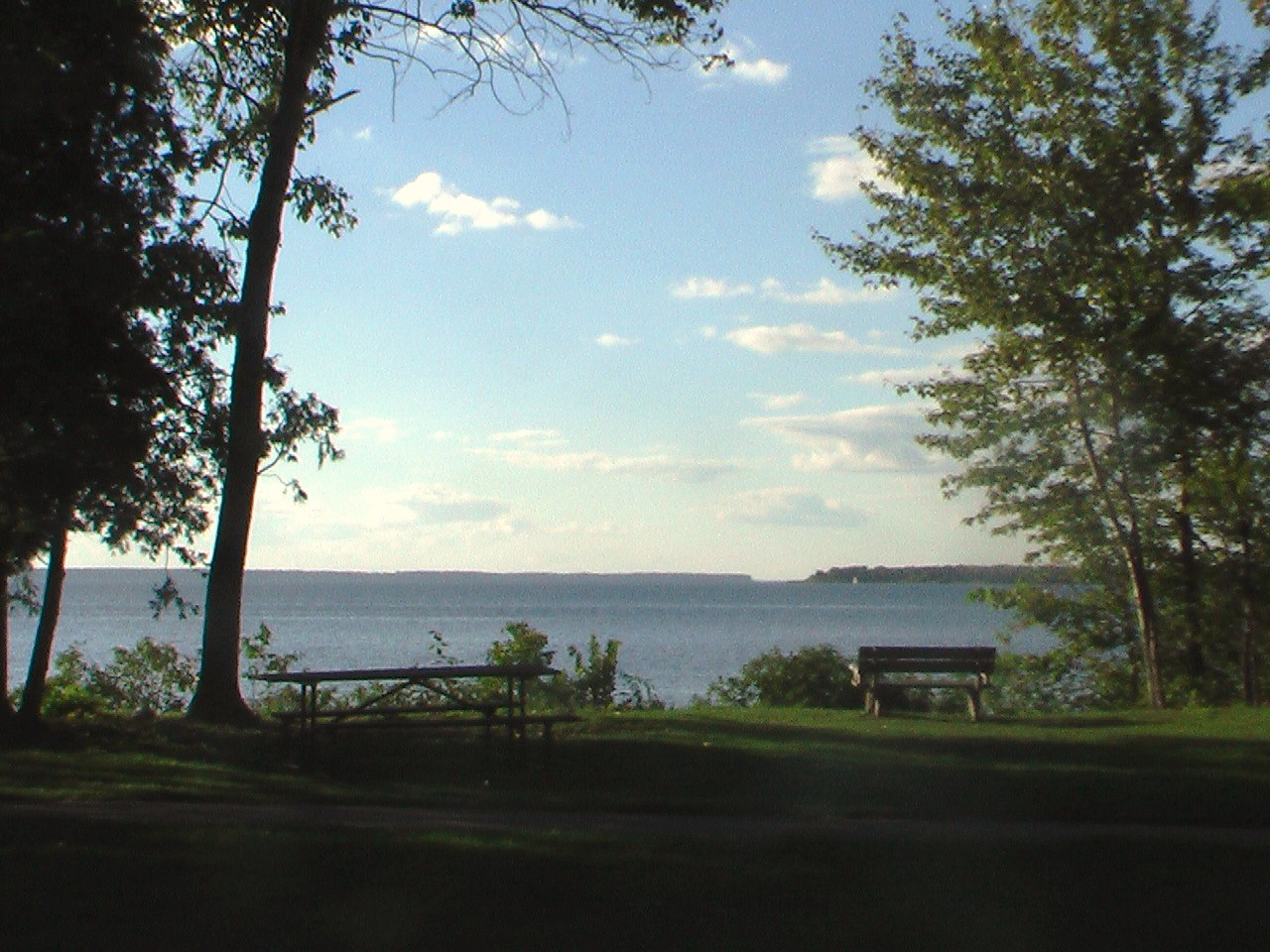
Weborg Point Picnic Area

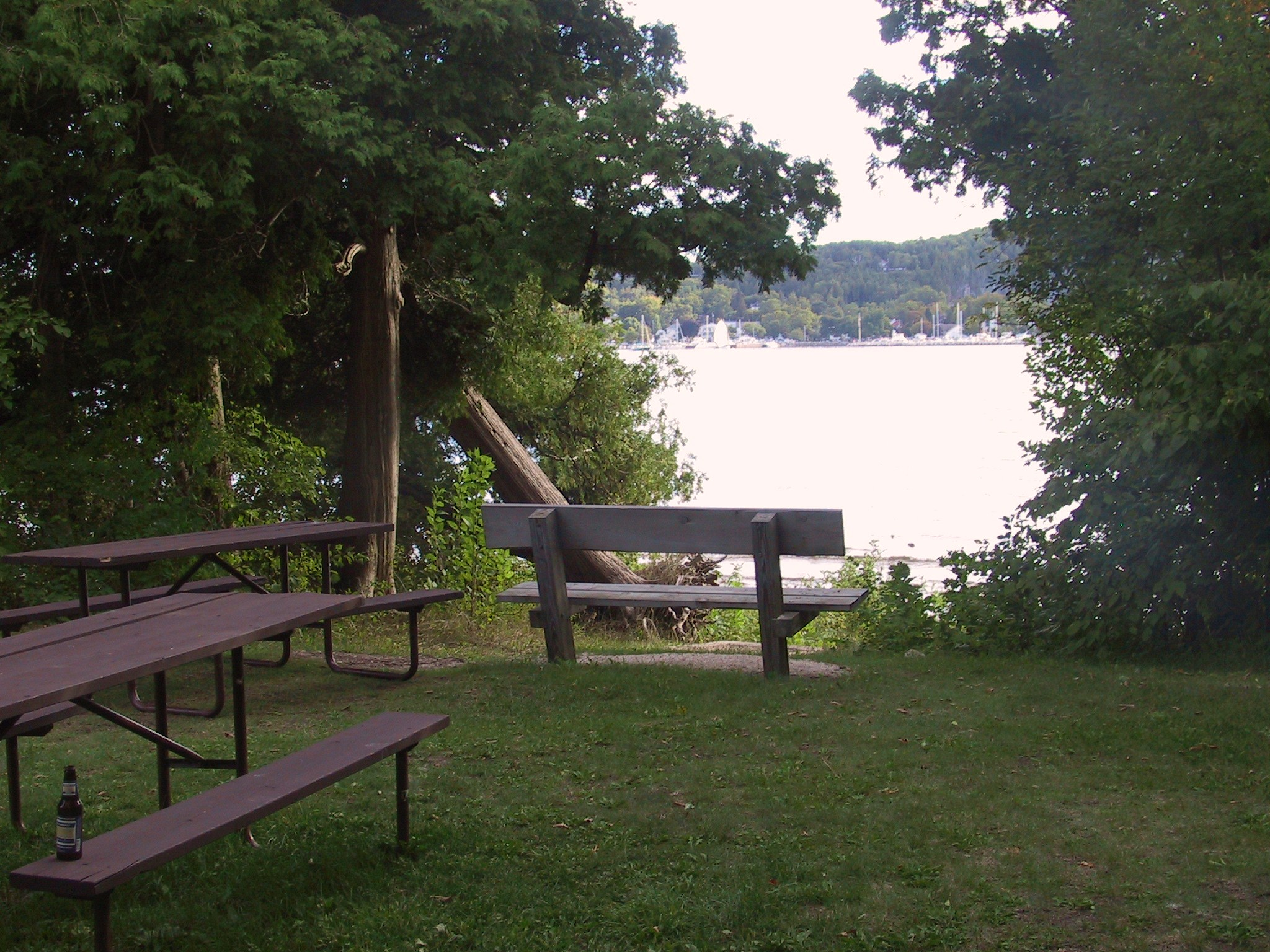
Nelson Point Picnic Area

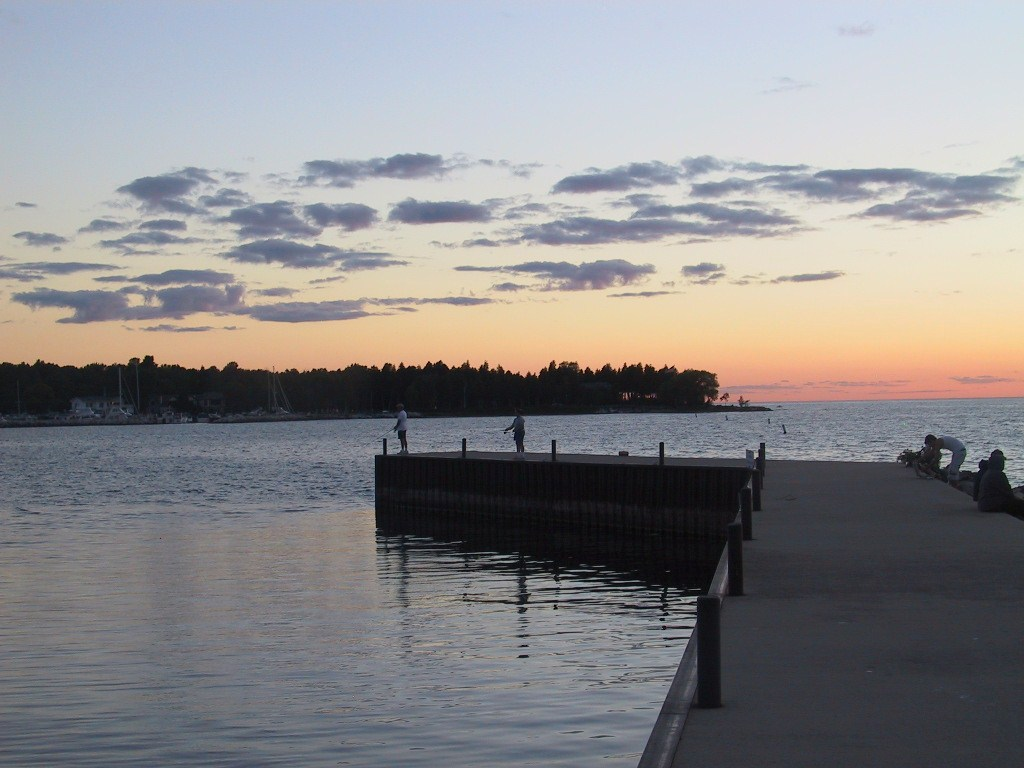
People fishing from the pier at Weborg Point

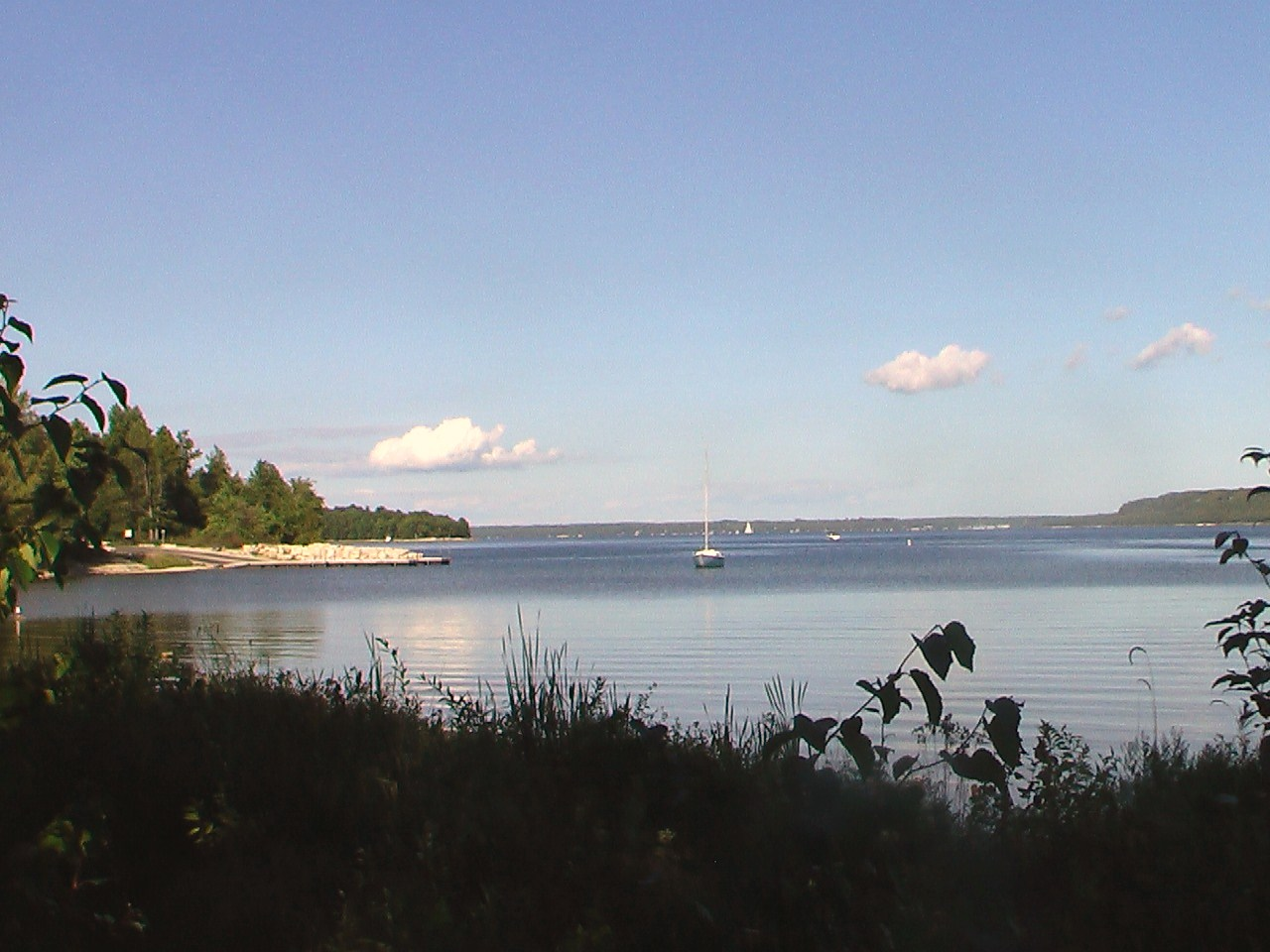
Boat launch in the vicinity of Welcker's Point, as seen from Nicolet Bay Trail

== Climate ==
Peninsula State Park

Climate chart (precipitation, max. and min. temperature)
J	F	M	A	M	J	J	A	S	O	N	D
63 −6 −9	52 −8 −18	49 1 −6	97 9 −1	86 14 4	91 19 9	105 19 14	96 22 17	96 18 13	107 10 5	80 5 2	57 2 −4
- █ Average max. and min. temperatures in °C
- █ Precipitation totals in mm
Imperial conversion
J	F	M	A	M	J	J	A	S	O	N	D
2.5 21 16	2 18 0	1.9 34 21	3.8 48 30	3.4 57 39	3.6 66 48	4.1 66 57	3.8 72 63	3.8 64 55	4.2 50 41	3.1 41 36	2.2 36 25
- █ Average max. and min. temperatures in °F
- █ Precipitation totals in inches

== Gallery ==
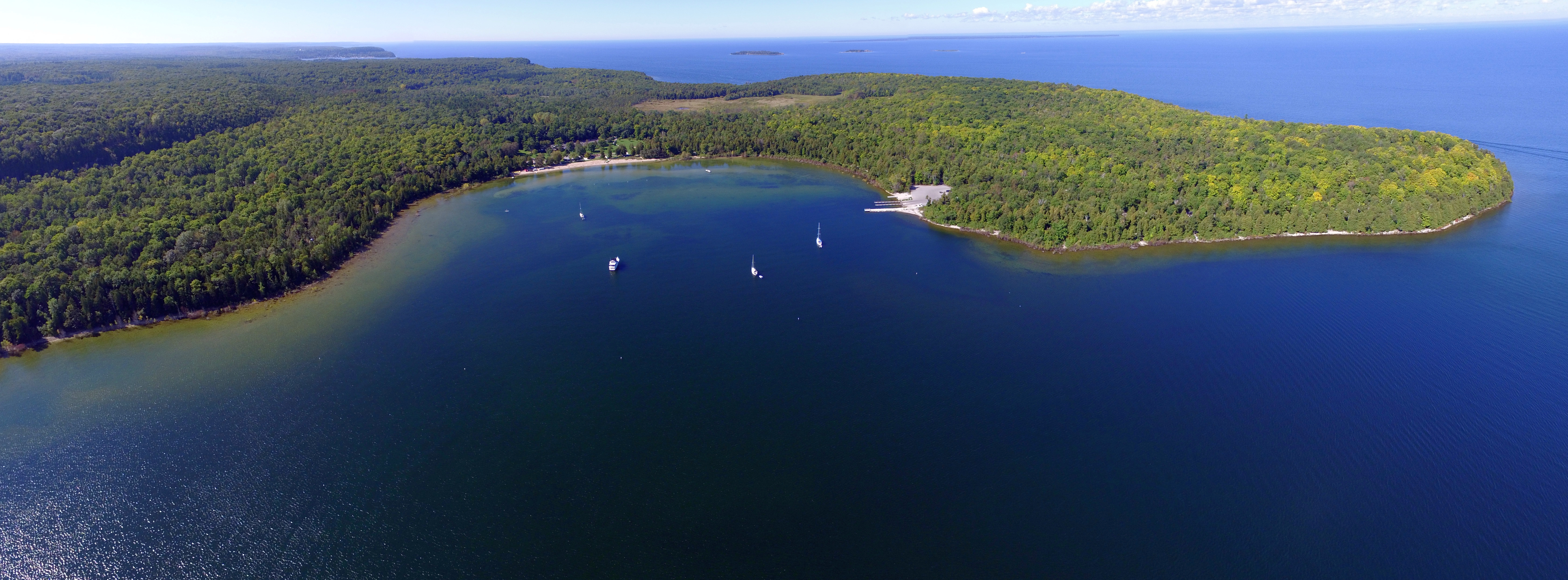
An aerial photo of Nicolet Bay

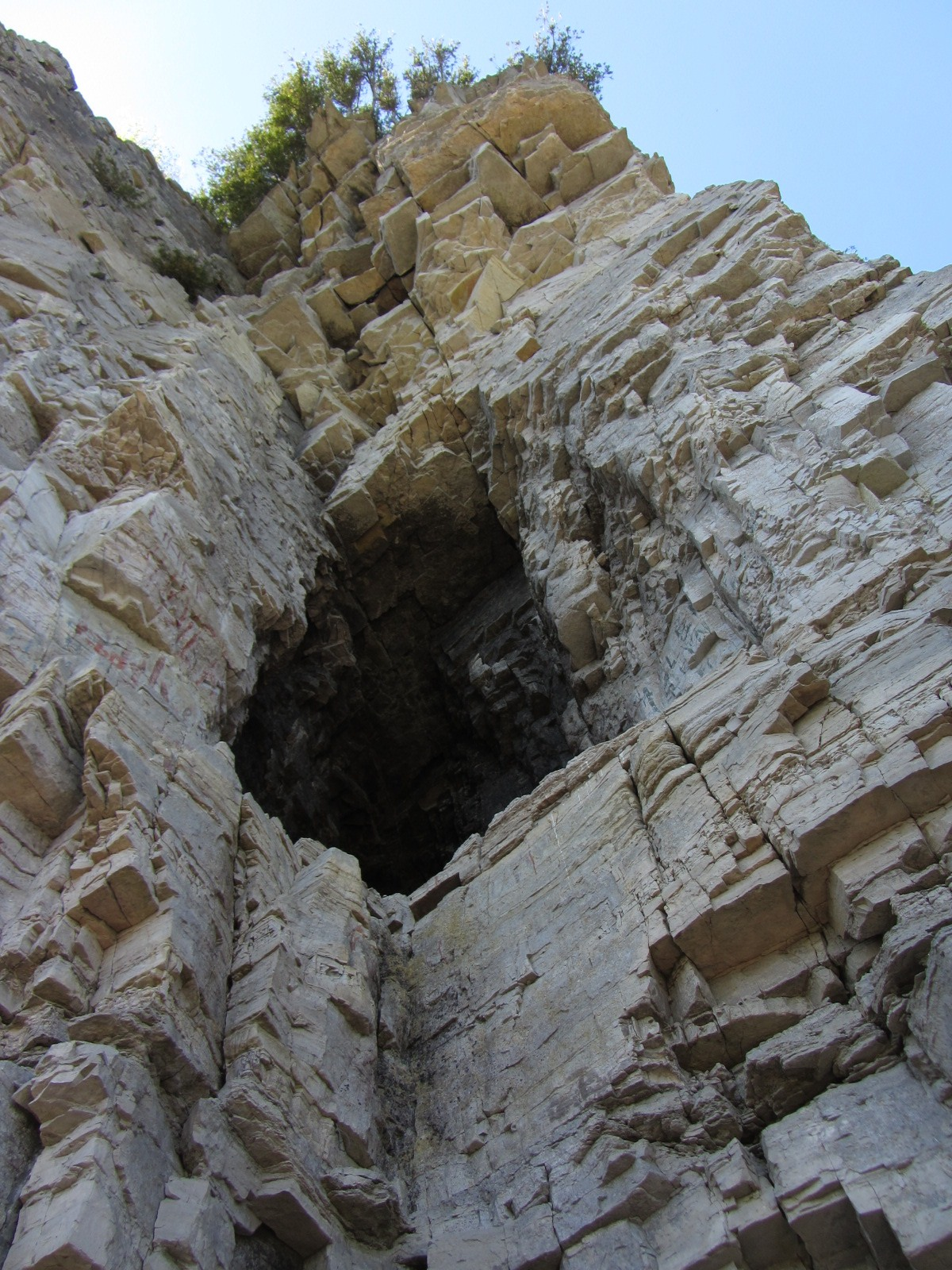
Eagle Cave, which is 41 feet long, 6 to 10 feet high, and contains seagull bones.

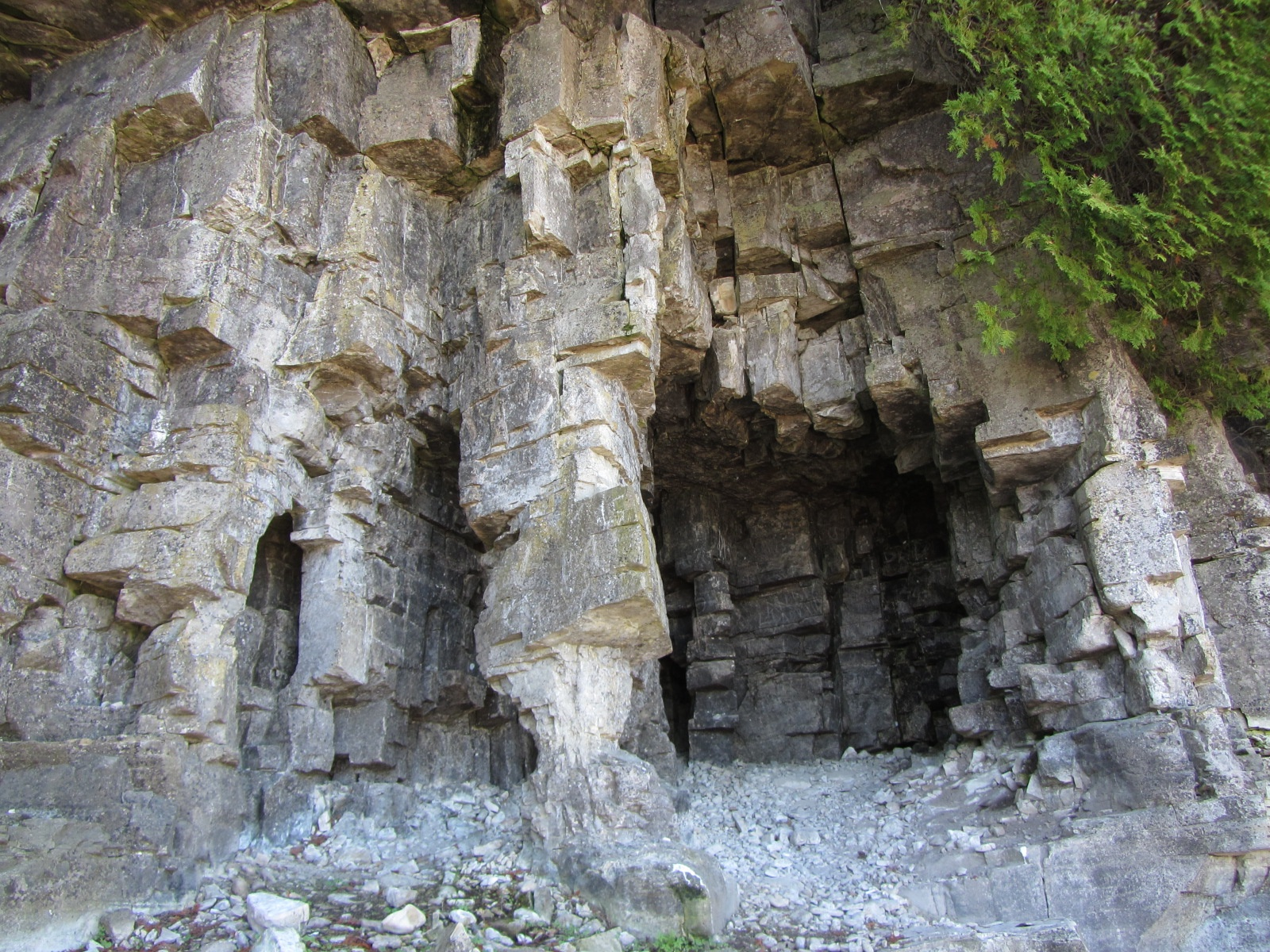
Column in the escarpment

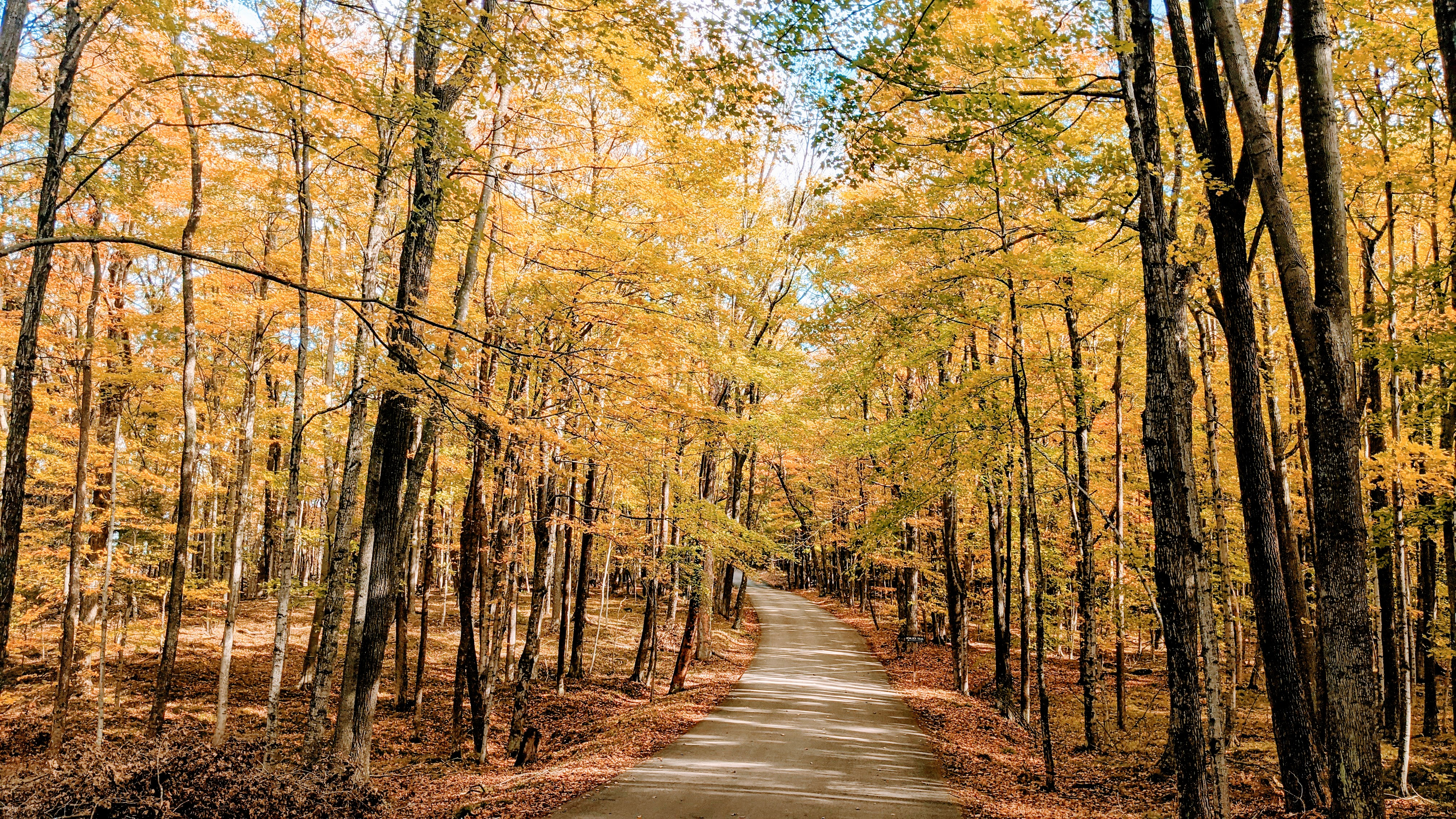
Skyway Road

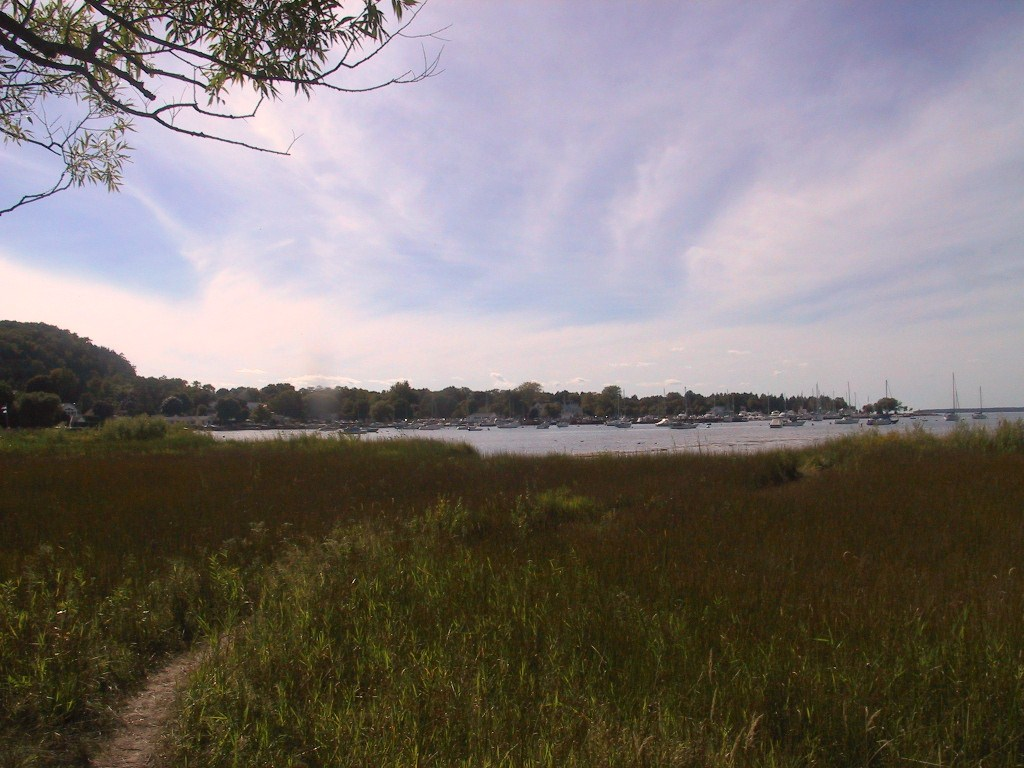
View of Fish Creek Harbor from the Hemlock Trail

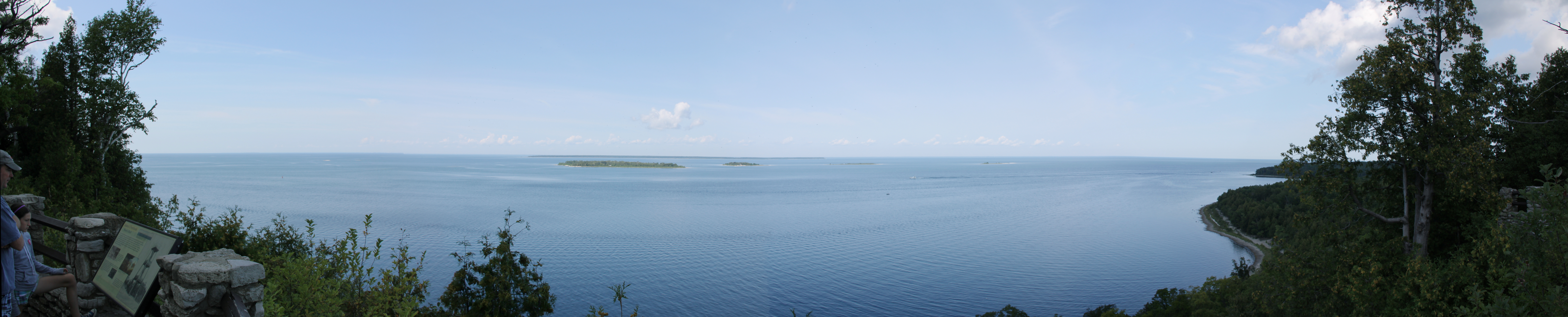
Stitched panorama showing all four Strawberry Islands (taken from Sven's Bluff)

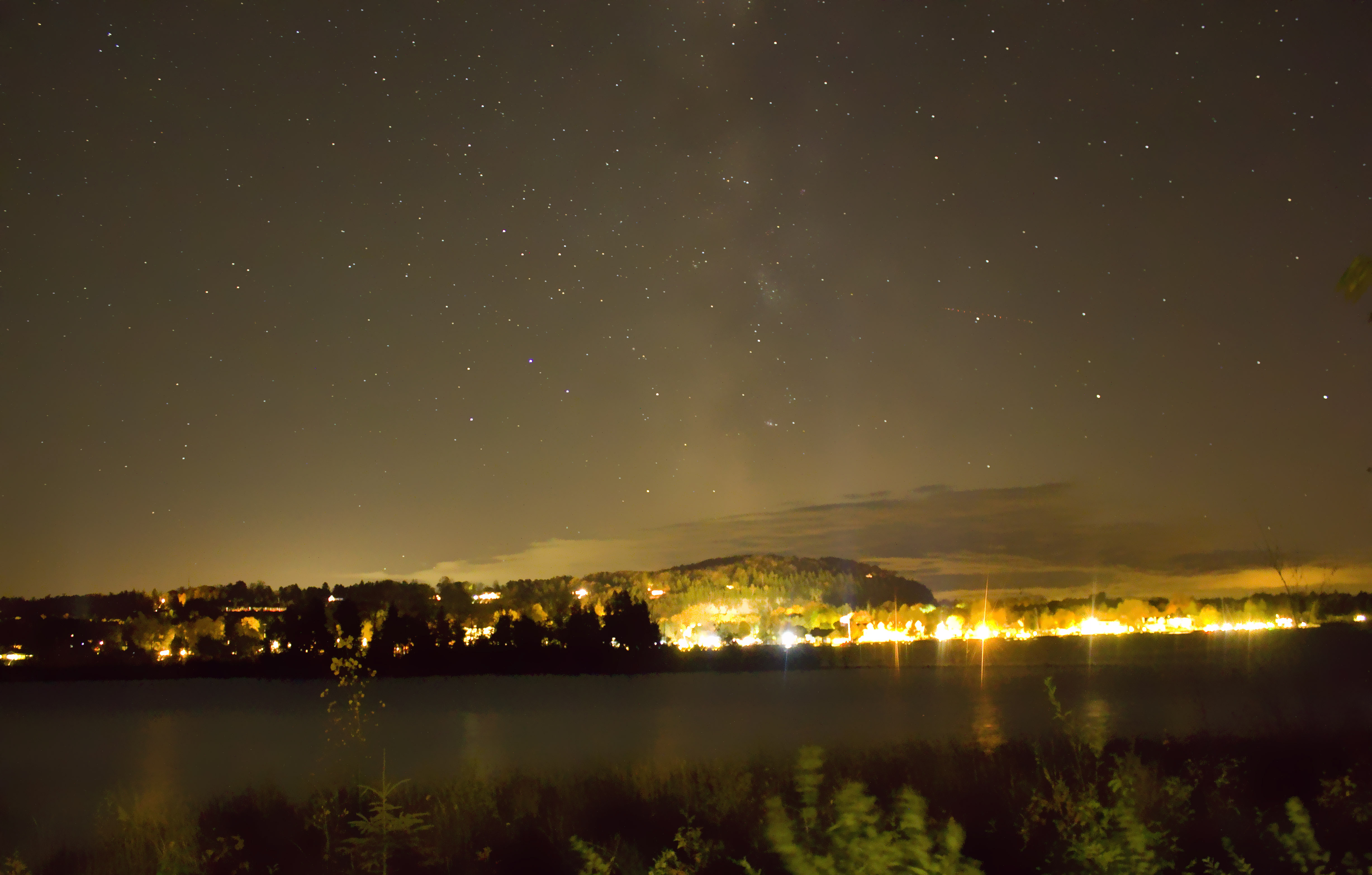
View from the park at night

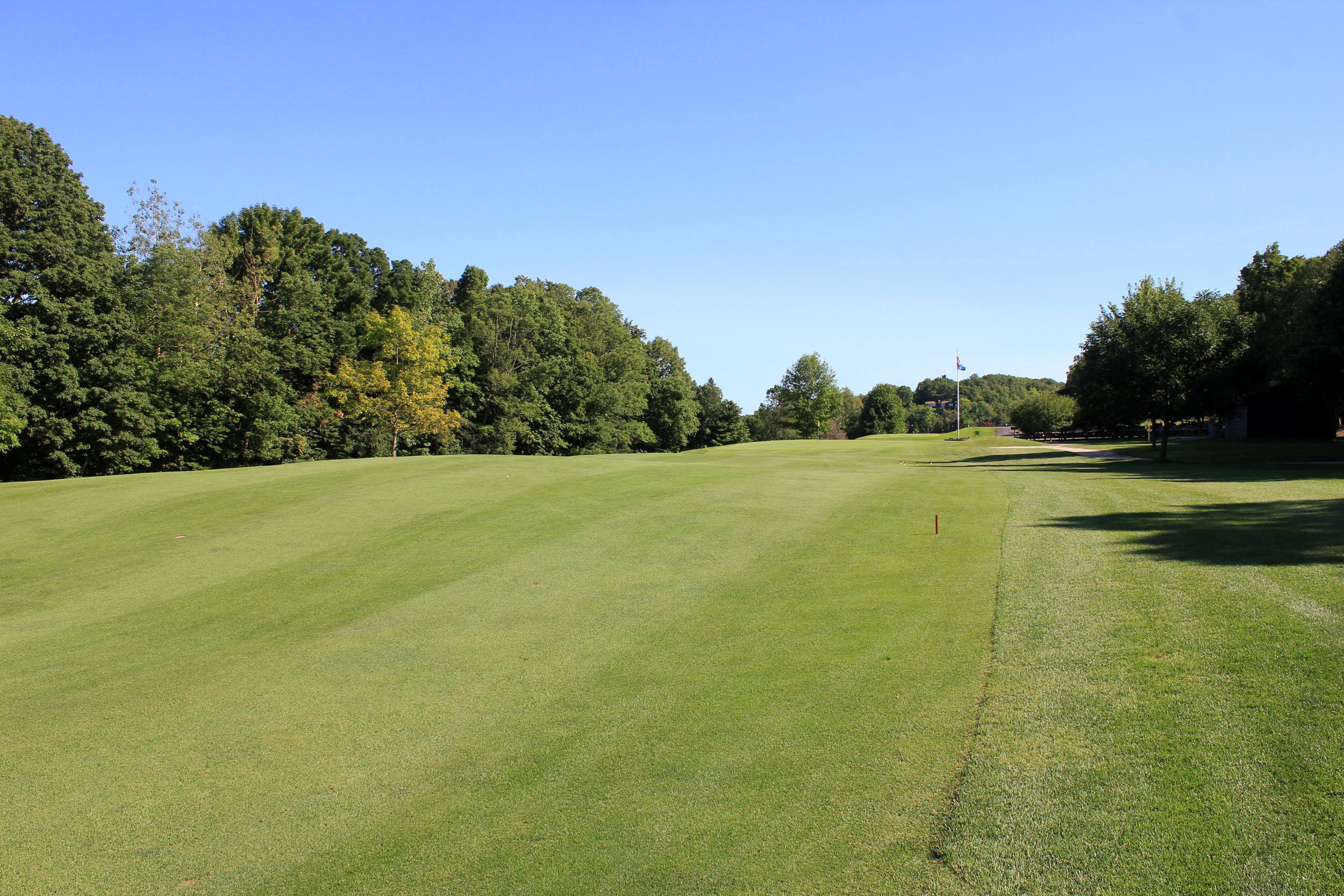
One of the fairways
