= Freeman and Jesse Thorp House and Cottages =

Historic house in Wisconsin, United States

- U.S. National Register of Historic Places
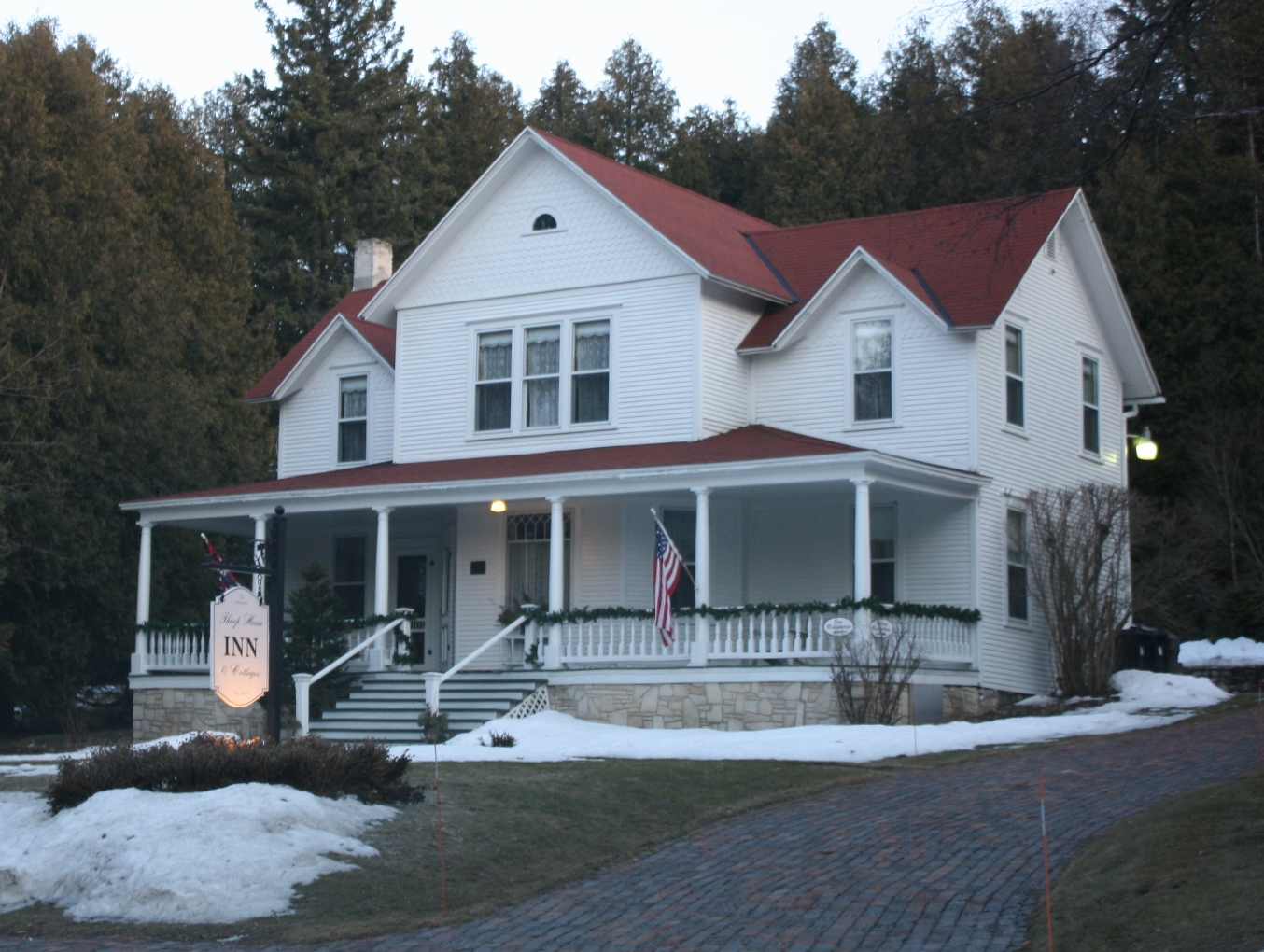
- Freeman and Jesse Thorp House and Cottages
- Location: 4135 Bluff St. Fish Creek, Wisconsin
- Coordinates: 45.12631°N 87.2446°W
- NRHP reference No.: 97000887
- Added to NRHP: August 15, 1997

The Freeman and Jesse Thorp House and Cottages are located in Fish Creek, Wisconsin, United States. In 1997 the site was added to the National Register of Historic Places.

== History ==
The house was built by Freeman Thorp, nephew of Fish Creek founder Asa Thorp. Upon Freeman's death in a shipwreck, his widow, Jesse, opened the house to lodgers as a way to make money. After closing its doors in the 1960s, the site was renovated in 1986 and was re-opened as a bed and breakfast. LaVyrle Spencer was inspired to writer her best-selling novel Bitter Sweet, centered on an innkeeper in Door County, Wisconsin, after staying at the bed and breakfast during its re-opening week in 1986.
