= Fish Creek, Wisconsin =

- Unincorporated community
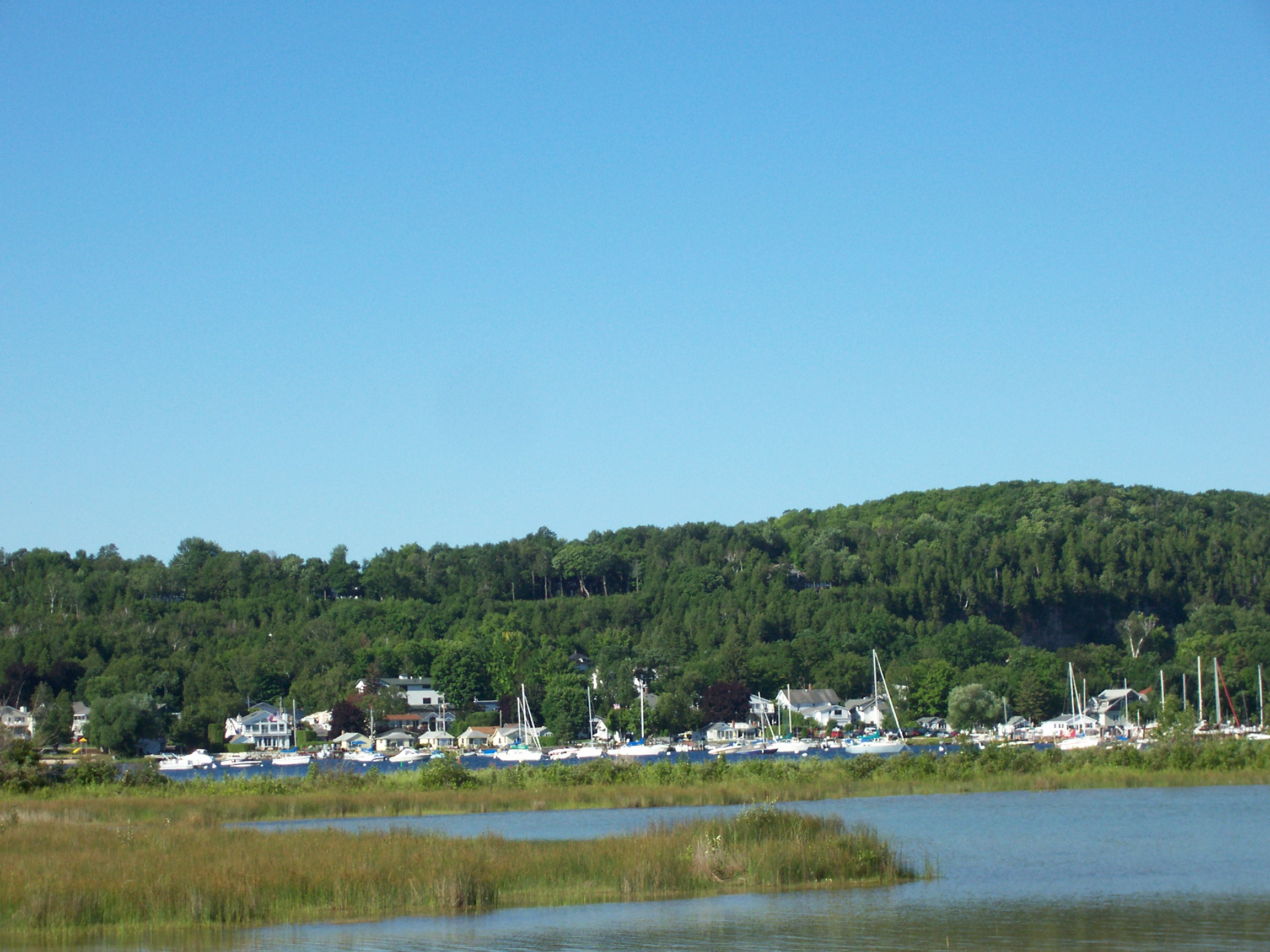
- Fish Creek marina from Peninsula State Park

- Location within the state of Wisconsin
- Coordinates: 45°07′40″N 87°14′49″W
- Country: United States
- State: Wisconsin
- County: Door
- Town: Gibraltar
- Elevation: 600 ft (180 m)

Population (2010)
  - Total: 997
- Time zone: UTC-6 (Central (CST))
  - Summer (DST): UTC-5 (CDT)
- ZIP code: 54212
- Area code: 920
- GNIS feature ID: 1564983

Fish Creek is an unincorporated community located in Door County, Wisconsin, United States, within the town of Gibraltar. It is located on Highway 42 along Green Bay.

== History ==
Fish Creek sits on the site of a Menominee and Ojibwa village known as Ma-go-she-kah-ning, or "trout fishing". The first settler of Fish Creek was Increase Claflin and his family circa 1844, and the village founder is considered to be entrepreneur Asa Thorp. Loggers and fishermen started settling in Fish Creek in 1853. Thorp owned much of the area's land by that year, and built Fish Creek's first dock in 1855. The first post office began in 1866 in the kitchen of John Brown's home. Fish Creek's oldest unchanged residence, the Alexander Noble House, was built in 1875 and is on the National Register of Historic Places.

Fish Creek is adjacent to Peninsula State Park, whose main entrance is in the village.

=== Historical landmarks ===
- Freeman and Jesse Thorp House and Cottages
- Vorous General Store

== Climate ==
Fish Creek Harbor and Thorp Pond

Climate chart (precipitation, max. and min. temperature)
J	F	M	A	M	J	J	A	S	O	N	D
63 −6 −9	52 −8 −18	49 1 −6	97 9 −1	86 14 4	91 19 9	105 19 14	96 22 17	96 18 13	107 10 5	80 5 2	57 2 −4
- █ Average max. and min. temperatures in °C
- █ Precipitation totals in mm
Imperial conversion
J	F	M	A	M	J	J	A	S	O	N	D
2.5 21 16	2 18 0	1.9 34 21	3.8 48 30	3.4 57 39	3.6 66 48	4.1 66 57	3.8 72 63	3.8 64 55	4.2 50 41	3.1 41 36	2.2 36 25
- █ Average max. and min. temperatures in °F
- █ Precipitation totals in inches

== Education ==
Gibraltar Area Schools serves the community. Gibraltar Elementary School and Gibraltar Secondary School are the two schools.

== Gallery ==
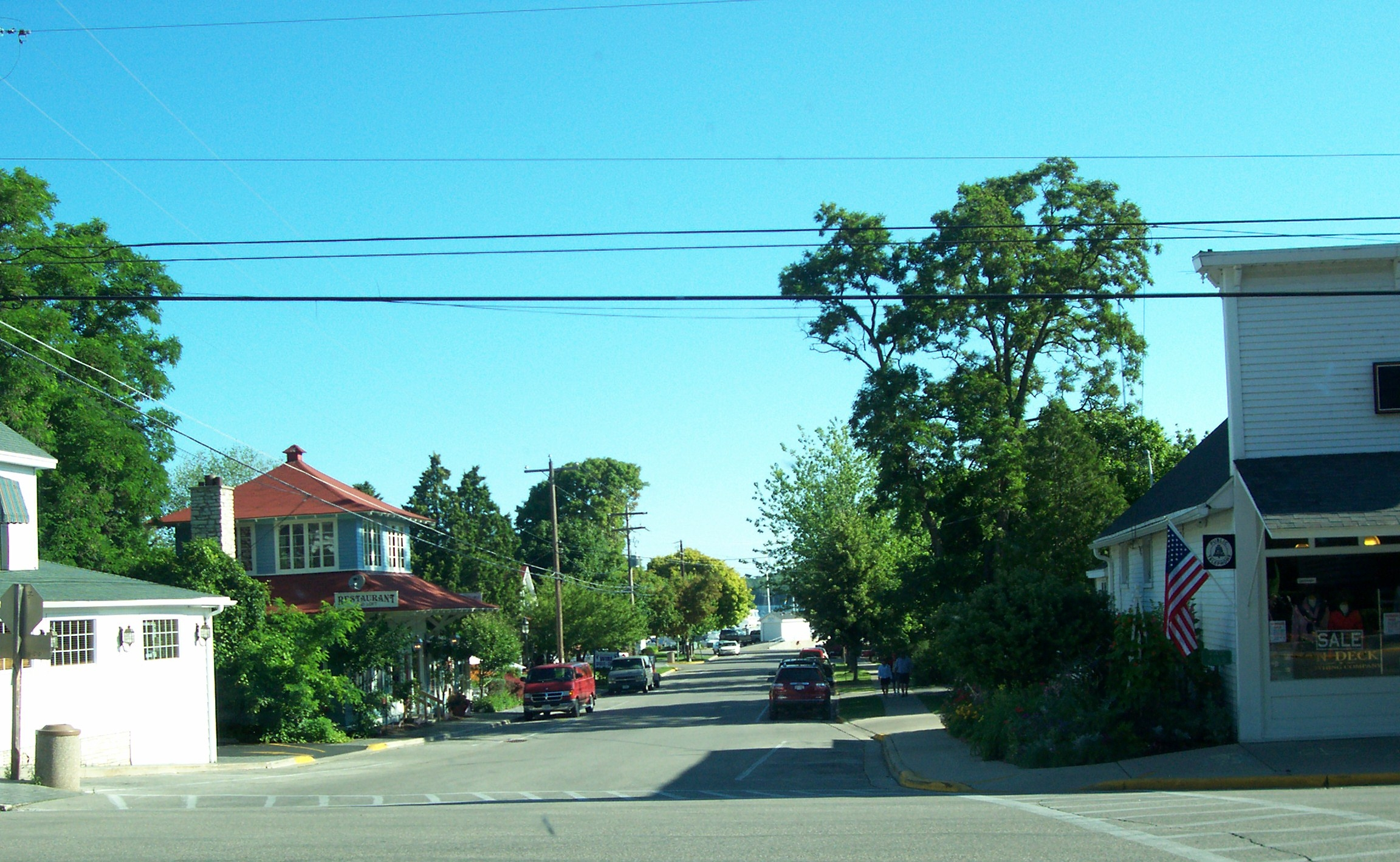
Downtown

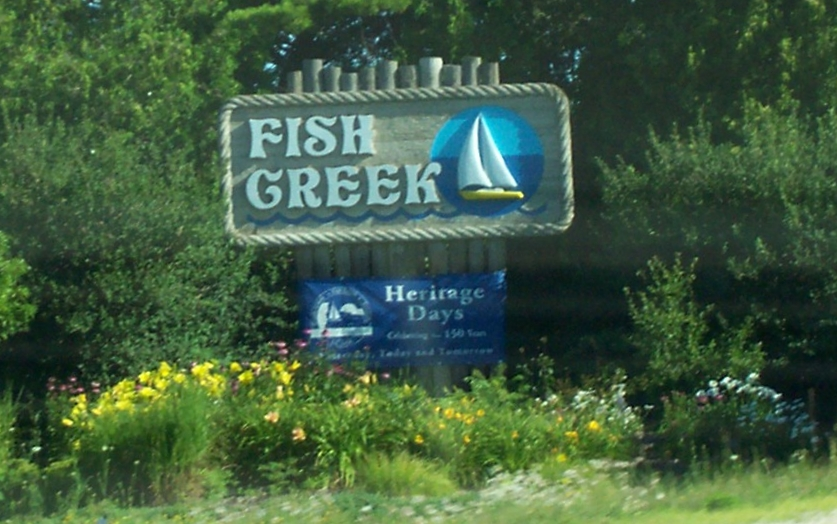
Welcome sign on WIS 42.

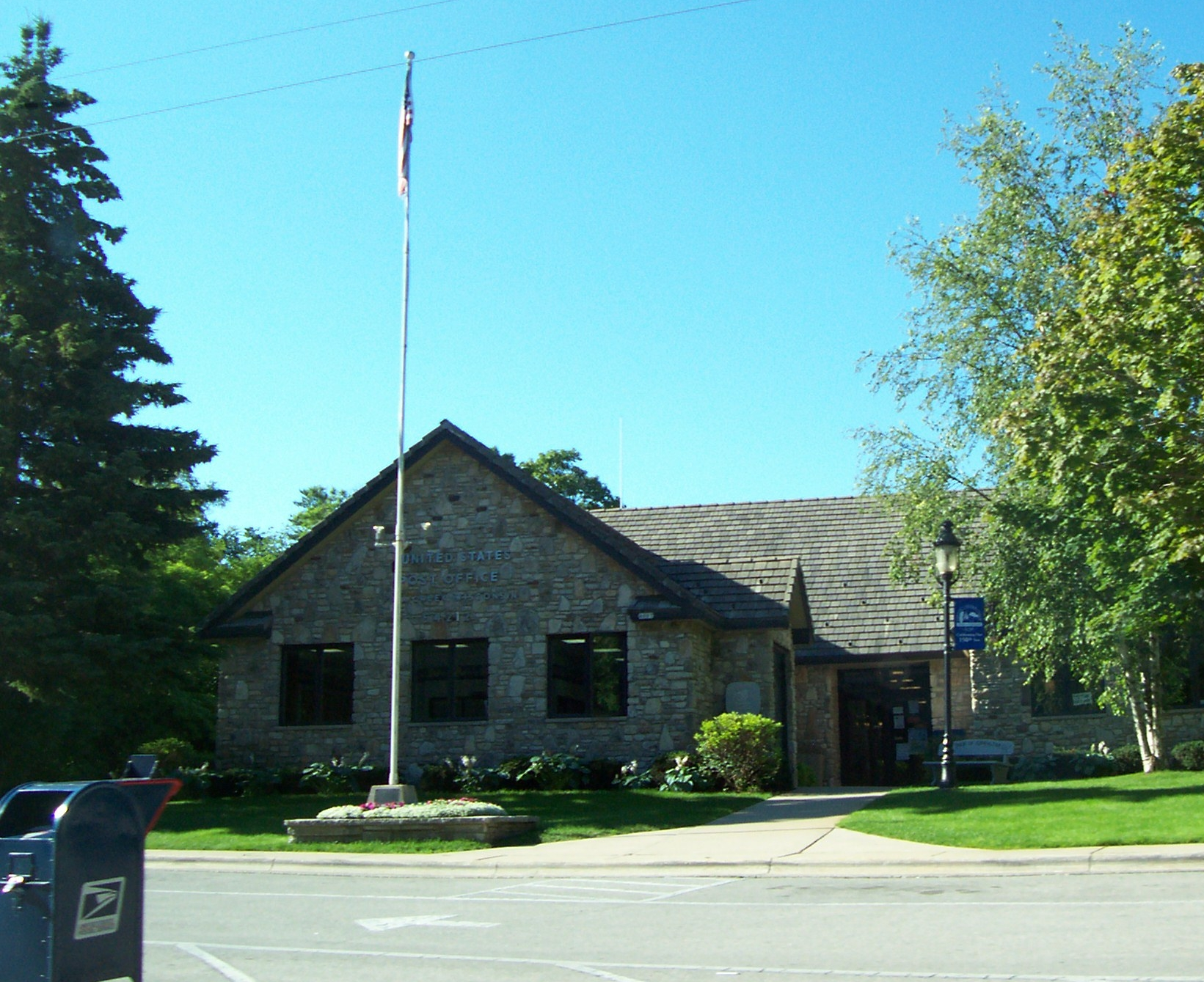
Post office

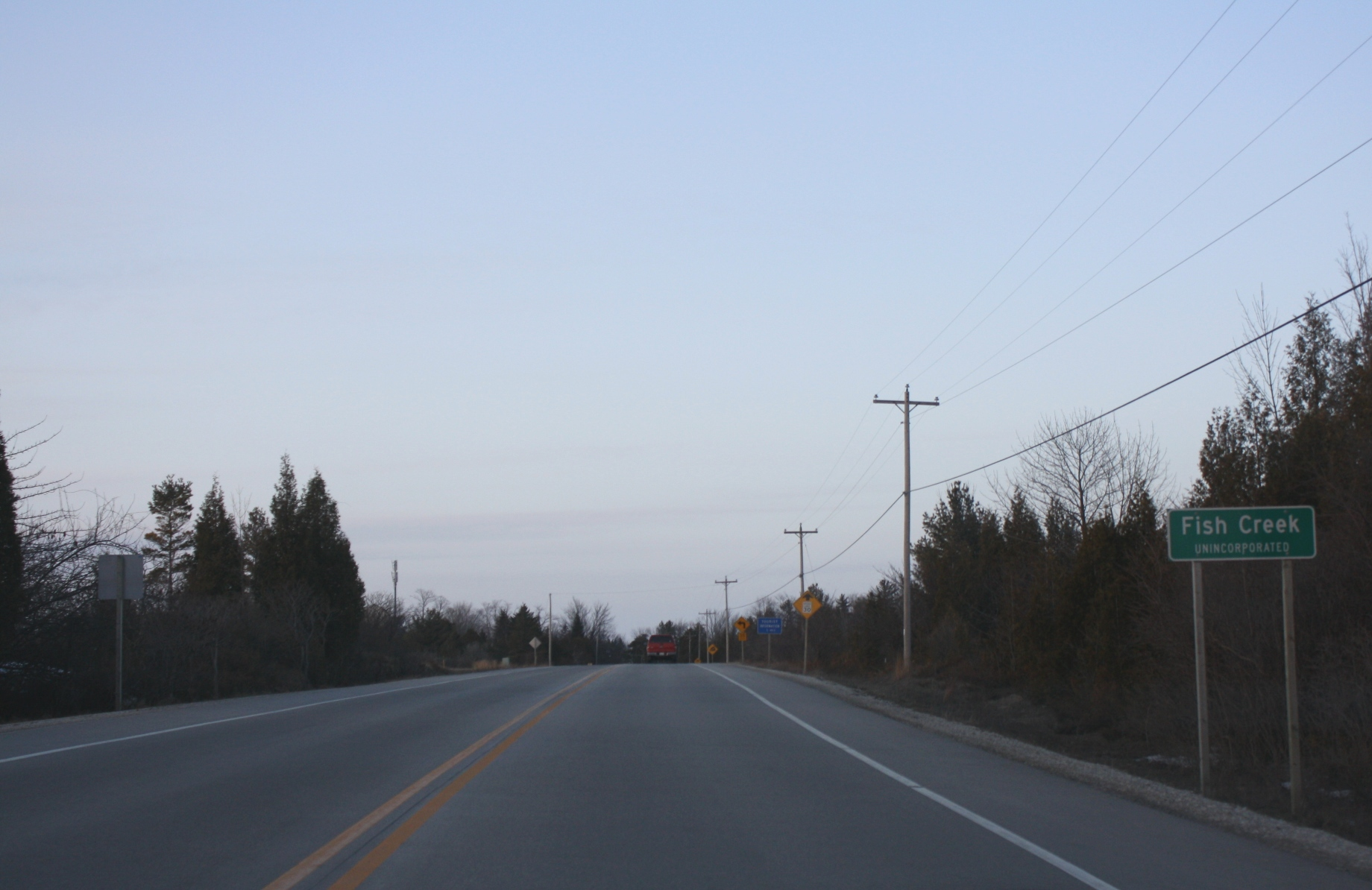
Sign on WIS 42

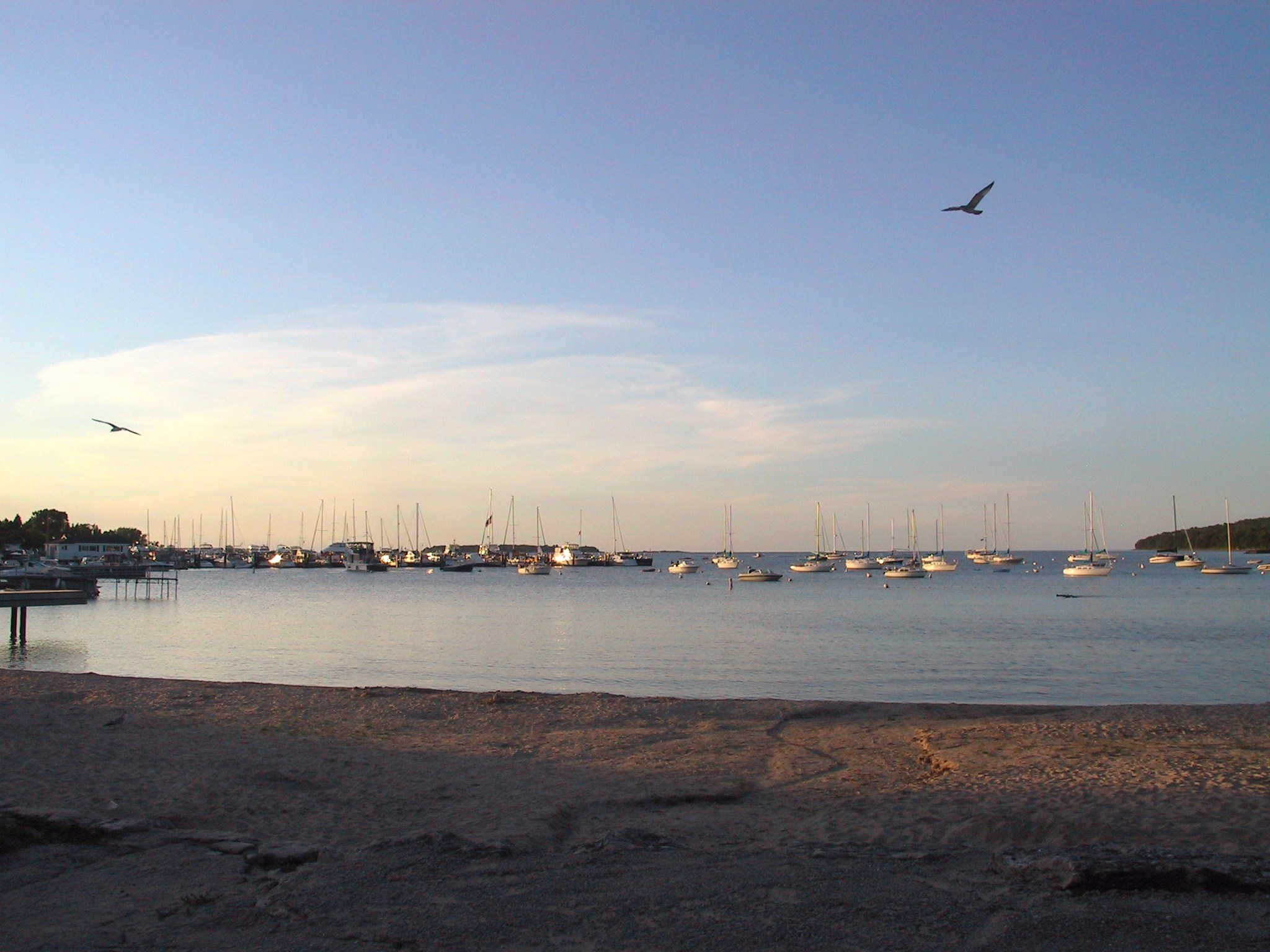
Harbor Park

July sunset at Harbor Park

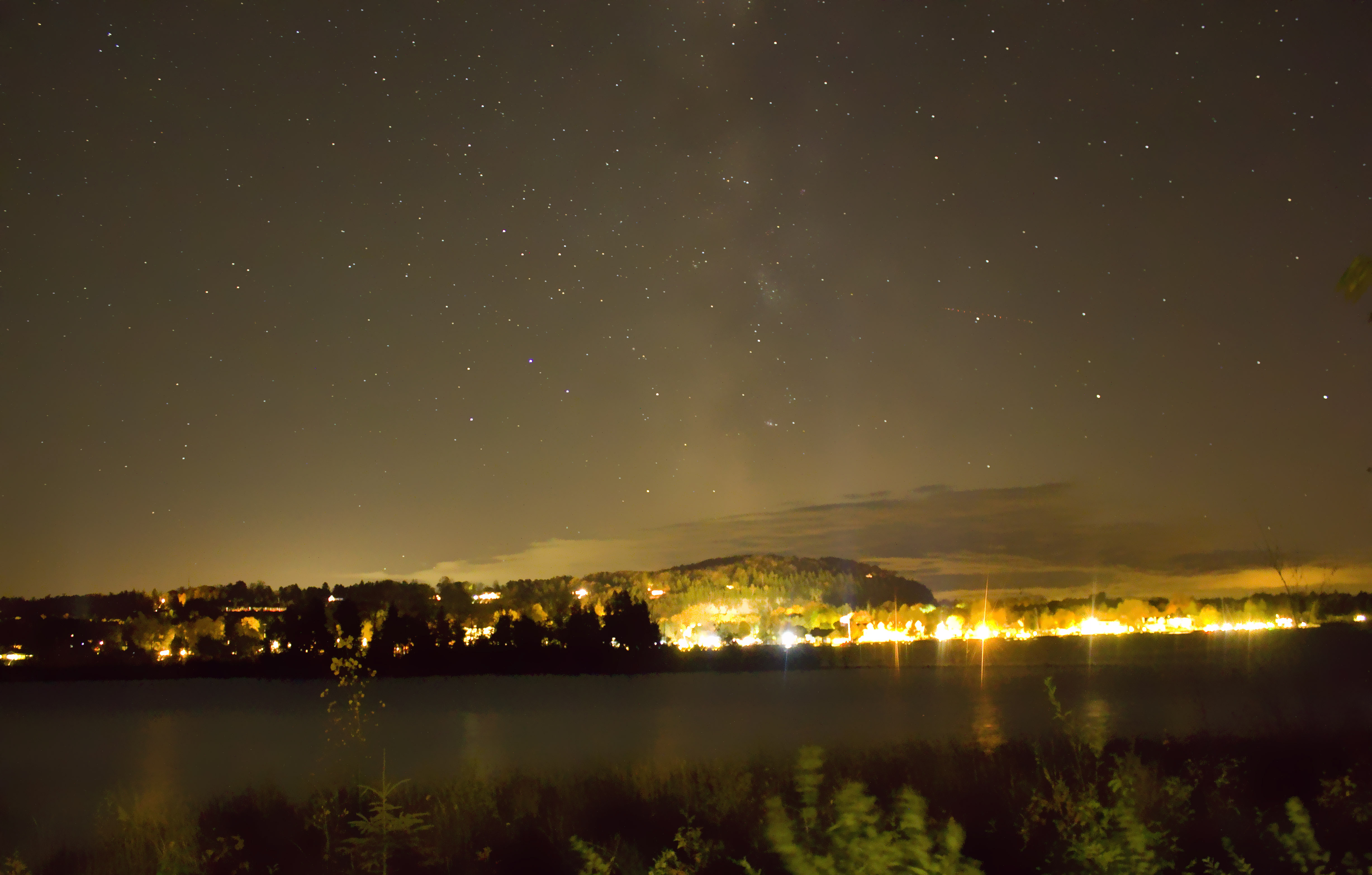
Fish Creek at night in October, as seen from Peninsula State Park

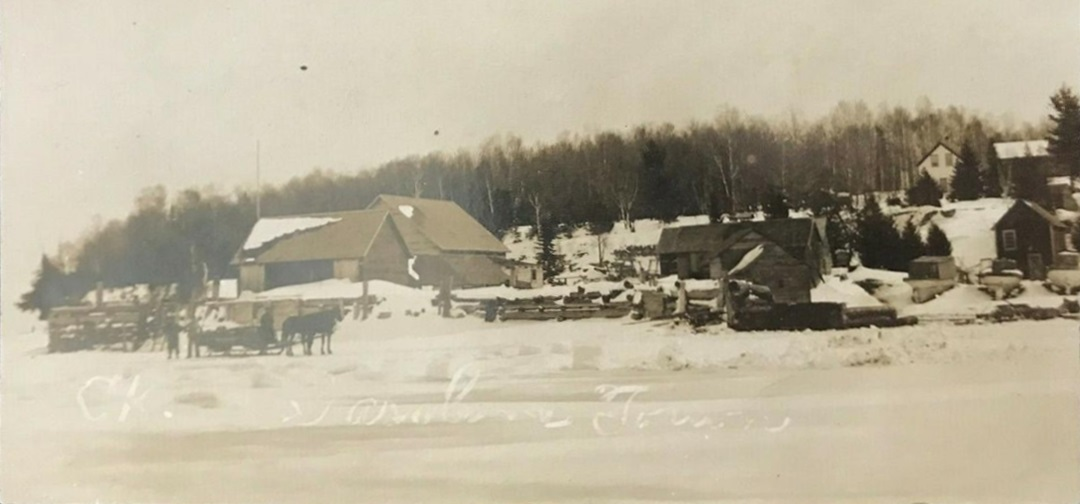
Fish Creek in the winter; postmarked 1909

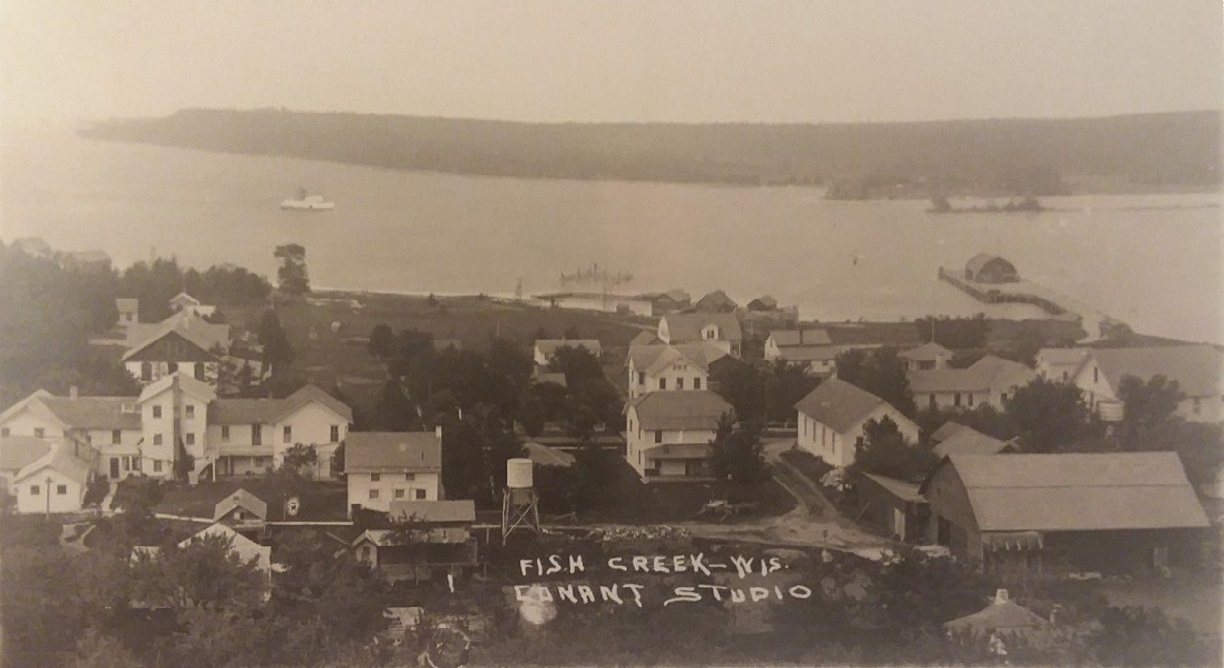
Fish Creek in the early 1900s

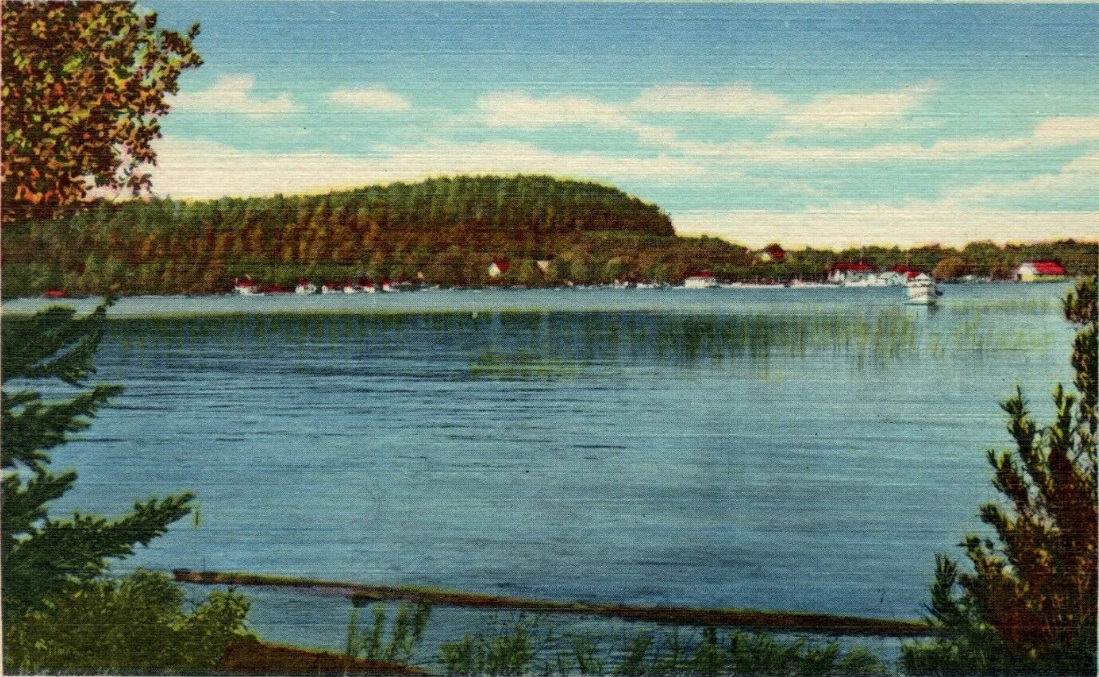
Fish Creek; from a postcard prior to 1946
