= Horseshoe Island (Wisconsin) =

Island in Wisconsin, United States

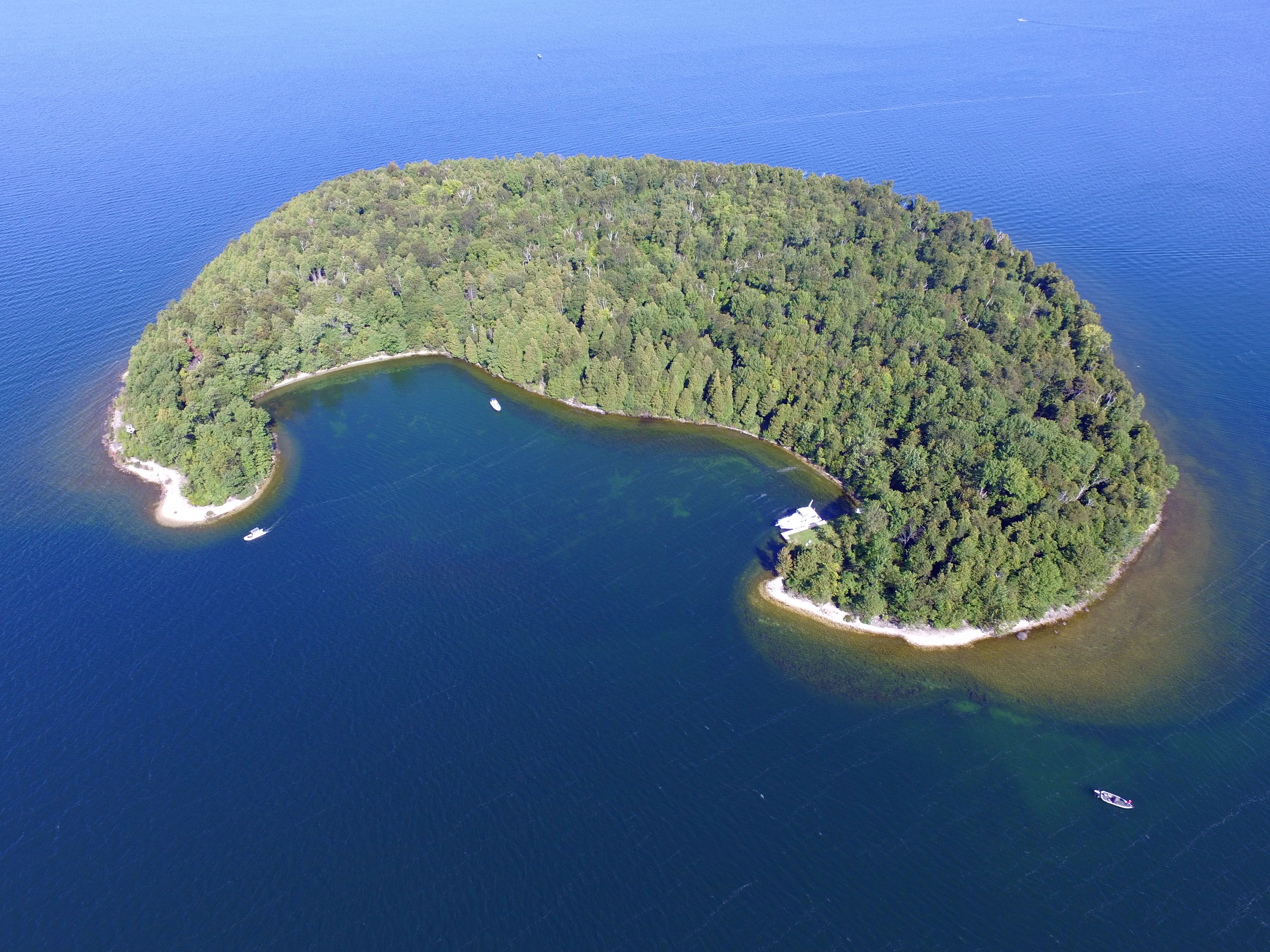
- Aerial view of Horseshoe Island

- Location within Wisconsin Location within the United States

Geography
- Location: Lake Michigan, Door County, Wisconsin
- Coordinates: 45°10′44″N 087°12′33″W
- Highest elevation: 607 ft (185 m)

Administration
- United States
- State: Wisconsin
- County: Door
- Town: Gibraltar

Horseshoe Island is an island in Green Bay in Door County, Wisconsin. The island is located offshore from Peninsula State Park and is part of the state park. The French explorer Jean Nicolet reportedly landed on the island. The island is part of the Town of Gibraltar, and lies offshore from the village of Ephraim, Wisconsin.

== Climate ==
Horseshoe Island

Climate chart (precipitation, max. and min. temperature)
| J | F | M | A | M | J | J | A | S | O | N | D |
| 63 −7 −12 | 52 −6 −13 | 49 −2 −9 | 97 10 −1 | 86 15 3 | 91 17 11 | 105 23 16 | 96 23 14 | 96 18 13 | 107 11 7 | 80 4 1 | 57 −2 −6 |
- █ Average max. and min. temperatures in °C
- █ Precipitation totals in mm
Imperial conversion
| J | F | M | A | M | J | J | A | S | O | N | D |
| 2.5 19 10 | 2 21 9 | 1.9 28 16 | 3.8 50 30 | 3.4 59 37 | 3.6 63 52 | 4.1 73 61 | 3.8 73 57 | 3.8 64 55 | 4.2 52 45 | 3.1 39 34 | 2.2 28 21 |
- █ Average max. and min. temperatures in °F
- █ Precipitation totals in inches

== Gallery ==
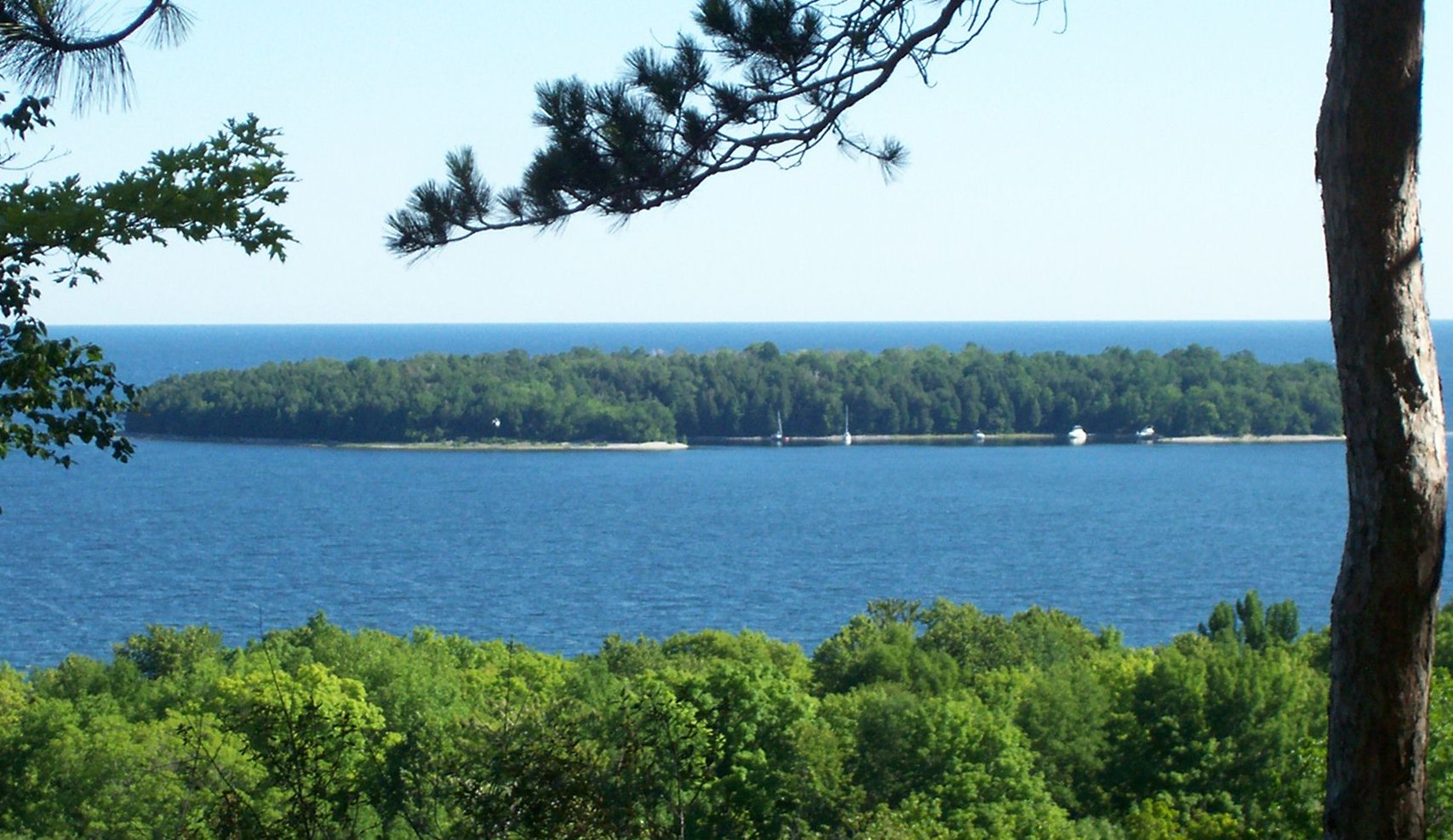
Horseshoe Island from mainland in Peninsula State Park.

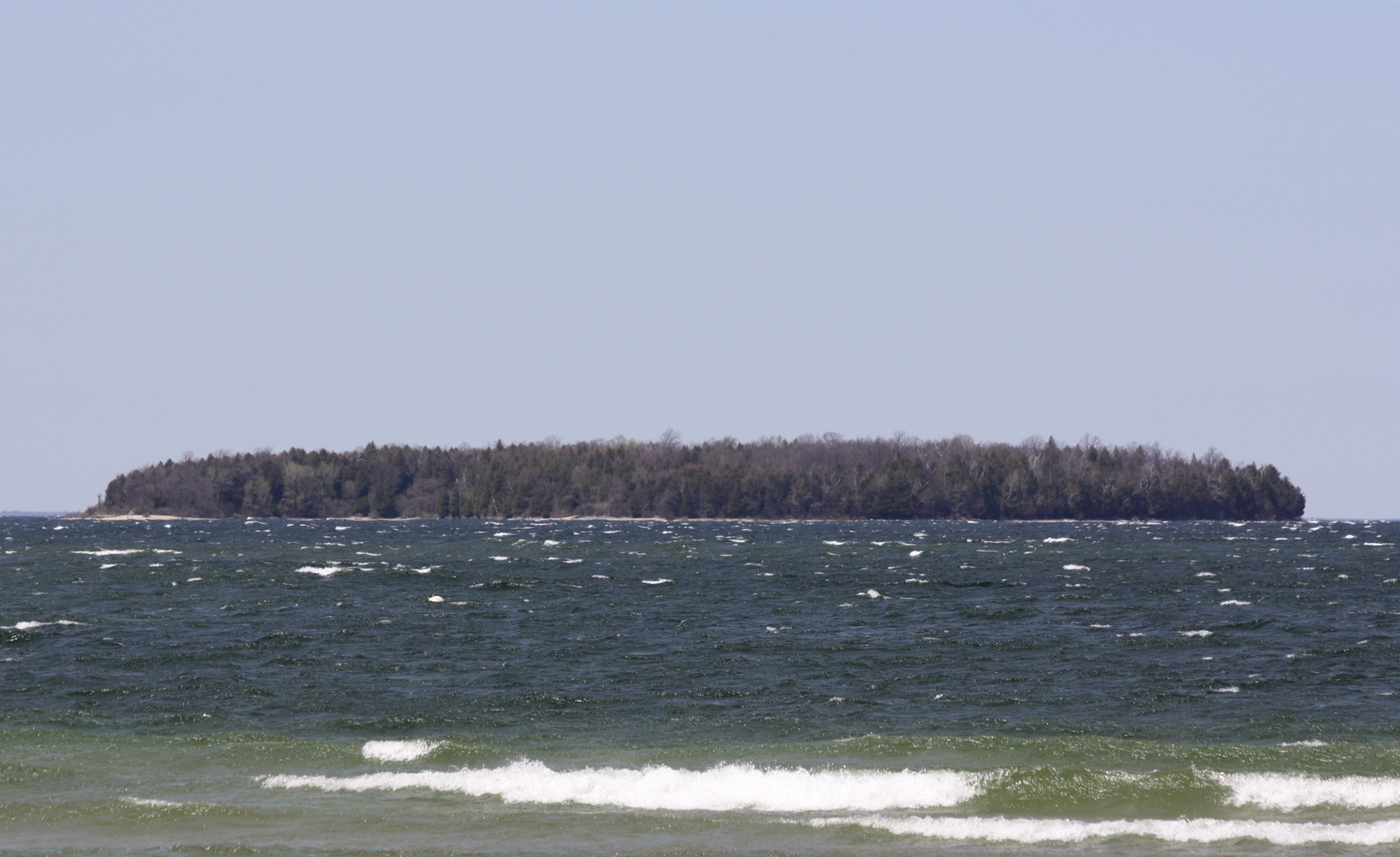
Horseshoe Island from Ephraim.

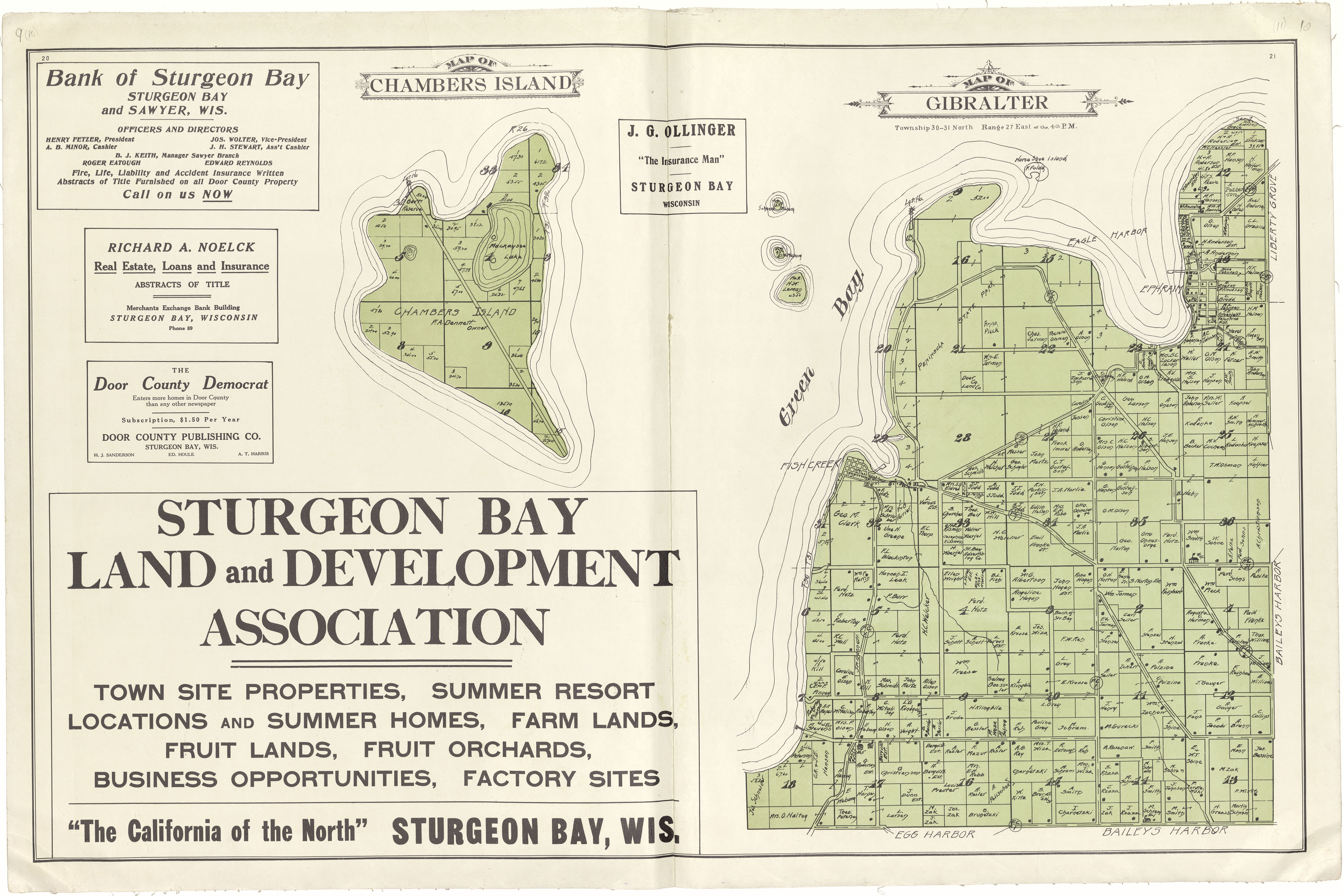
A map of the northwestern shore of Door County. Horseshoe Island can be seen on the right, north of Peninsula State Park.
