= Vorous General Store =

- U.S. National Register of Historic Places
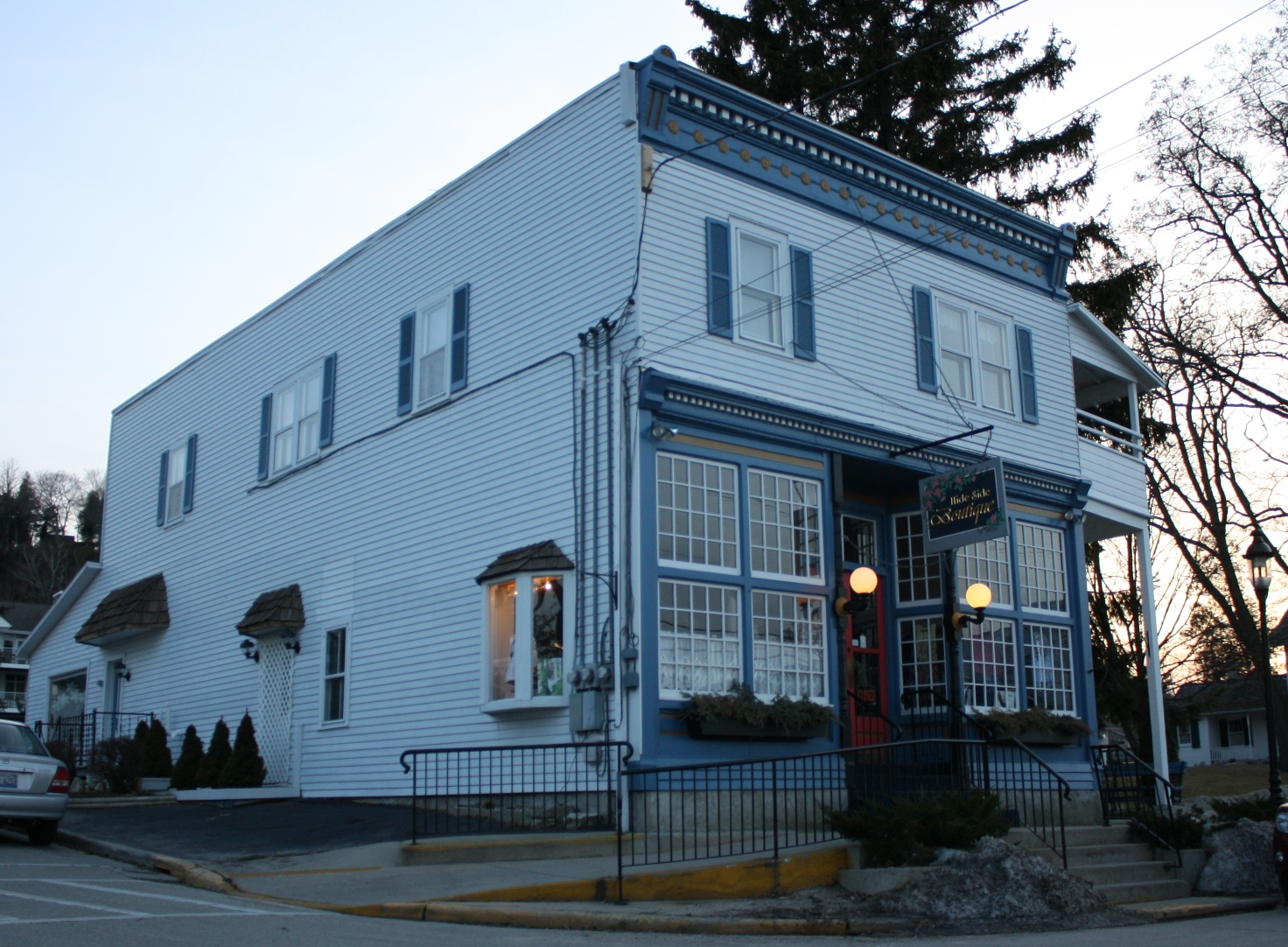

- Location within Wisconsin Location within the United States
- Location: 4153 WI 42, Fish Creek, Wisconsin
- Coordinates: 45°7′39″N 87°14′47″W
- Area: less than one acre
- Architectural style: Italianate
- NRHP reference No.: 97000429
- Added to NRHP: May 9, 1997

The Vorous General Store is a historic general store in Fish Creek, Wisconsin. Levi Vorous built the store in 1895; it was the third store to open in Fish Creek. The Commercial Italianate building features a metal cornice with corner brackets and dentils as well as decorative cast iron fixtures, including a beam separating the building's two stories. The store stayed in the Vorous family until 1920, when Levi's widow Rachel sold it to Henry Eckert, Henry Stenzel, and Carl Seiler. In 1932, the store became Fish Creek's post office, a function which it retained until 1959; Seiler served as the first postmaster.

The store was added to the National Register of Historic Places on May 9, 1997.
