= Alexander Noble House =

Historic house in Wisconsin, United States

- U.S. National Register of Historic Places
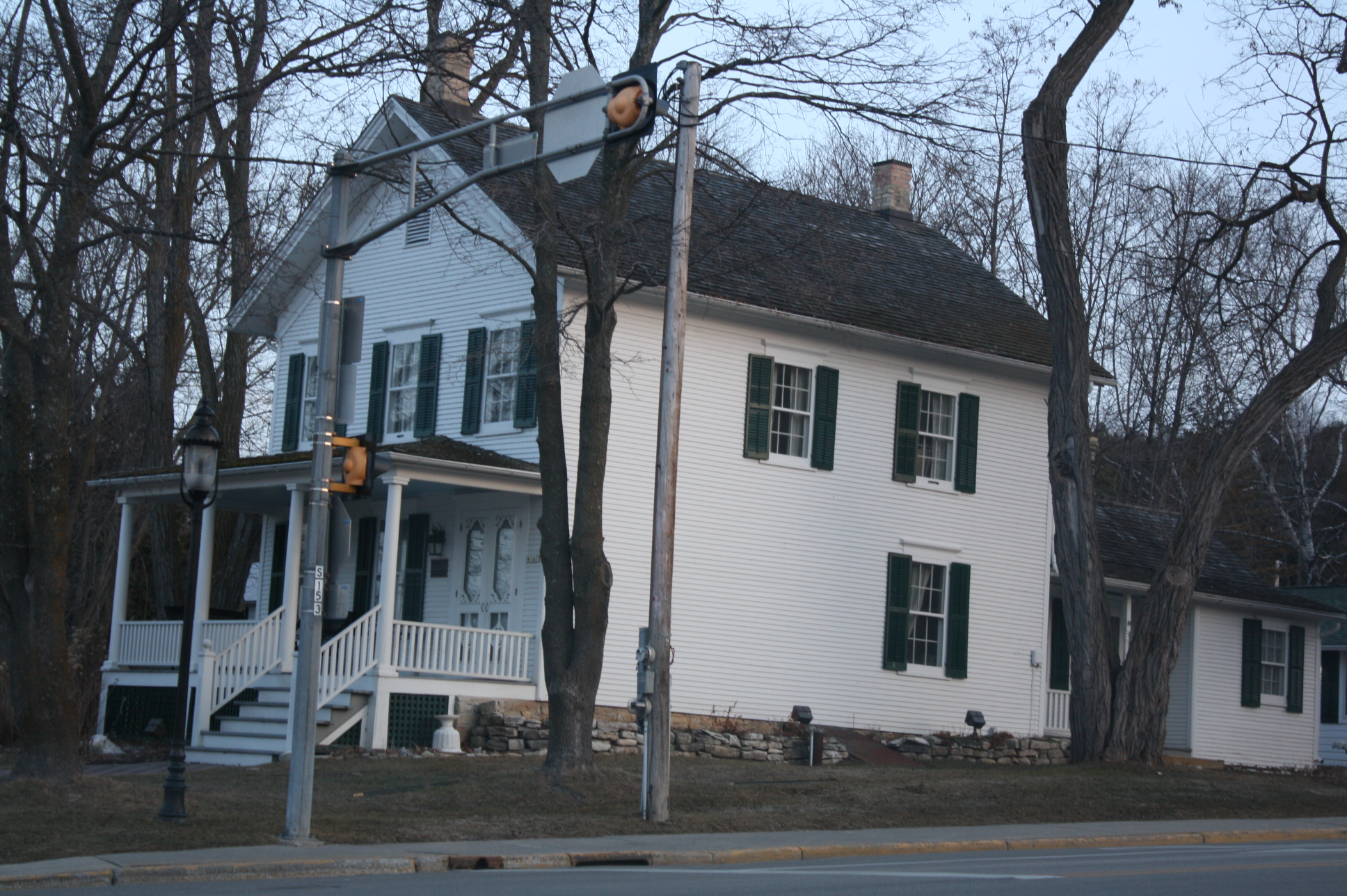

- Location within Wisconsin Location within the United States
- Location: Fish Creek, Wisconsin
- Coordinates: 45°7′39.44″N 87°14′47.61″W
- Area: 2 acres (0.81 ha)
- Built: 1875
- Architect: Alexander Noble
- Architectural style: Mid 19th Century Revival, Greek Revival
- NRHP reference No.: 96000159
- Added to NRHP: February 23, 1996

The Alexander Noble House, built in 1875, is a historic Greek Revival farmhouse located in Fish Creek, Door County, Wisconsin on Wisconsin Highway 42. The house was listed on the National Register of Historic Places on February 23, 1996.

== Description and history ==
Alexander Noble, one of the founders of Fish Creek, was born in Edinburgh, Scotland in 1829 and moved to Fish Creek in 1863. He served the community as blacksmith, postmaster, town chairman, and county board member.

Today, the restored Noble House contains many of its original furnishings and artifacts. The home's authentic room settings depict the period from 1875 to 1900. The house offers tours that portray life in Door County over a century ago, depicting the village as a thriving fishing and shipping village with horse-drawn wagons traveling the dirt streets.

The house is run as a nonprofit institution operated by the Gibraltar Historical Association, Box 323, Fish Creek, WI 54212.

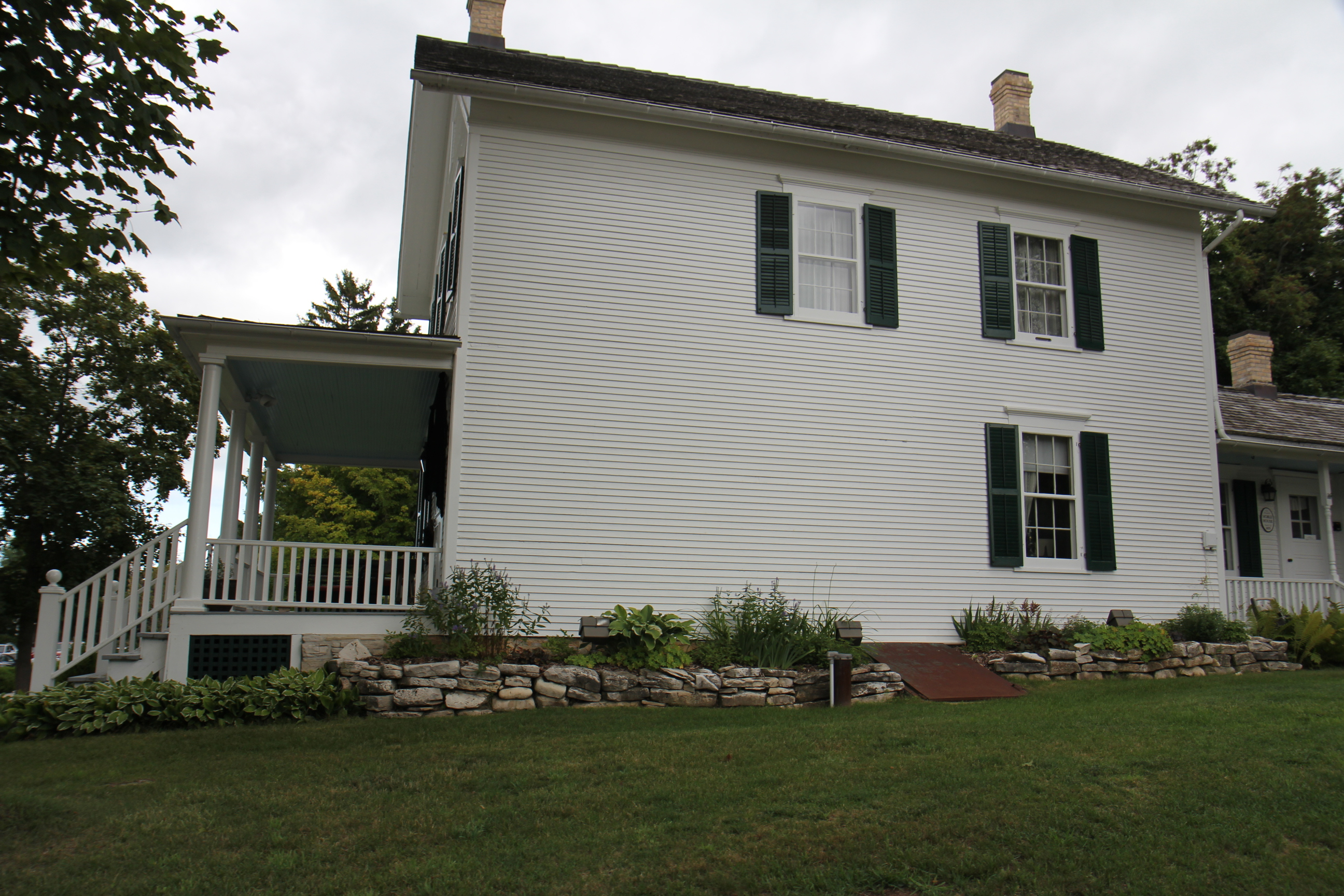
Side view of the house
