= ROCS =

ROCS may refer to:

- Responsible Outgoing College Students
- Republic of China Ship, operated by the Republic of China Navy
- Renewable Obligation Certificates
- RMIT Occasional Choral Society
- Roving Outdoor Conservation School
- Rocs, part of the KDE Education Project

== See also ==
- ROC (disambiguation)
- Roques (disambiguation)
- Rock (disambiguation)
- ROKS (disambiguation)
