= ROCK =

ROCK may refer to:

- Chicago, Rock Island and Pacific Railroad
- Rho-associated protein kinase, or Rho-associated coiled-coil kinase, a serine/threonine-specific protein kinase
- Rollergirls of Central Kentucky, roller derby league based in Lexington, Kentucky
- R.O.C.K., a 1986 hard rock/heavy metal album by Kirka
- Robert Orin Charles Kilroy, from the Styx rock opera Kilroy Was Here, see Mr. Roboto

== See also ==
- Rock (disambiguation)
- The Rock (disambiguation)
- ROC (disambiguation)
