= Catedral (Asunción) =

Cathedral in Asunción

Coordinates: 25.286°S 57.634°W

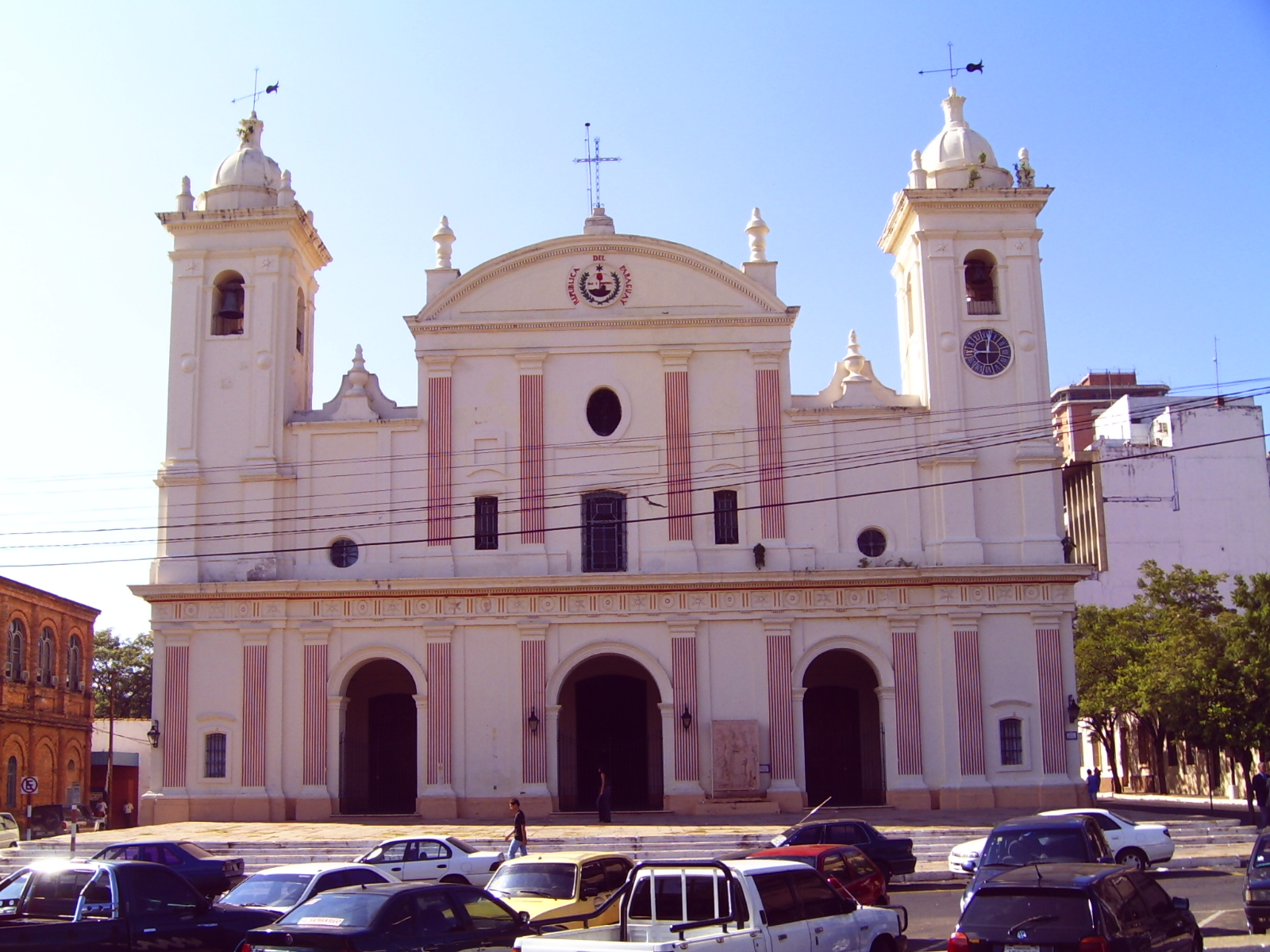
This neighbourhood is home to Asunción Cathedral

La Catedral is a barrio (neighbourhood) of Asunción, the capital of Paraguay. It has a population of 3,676 people and it is located next to the Paraguay River and other barrios such as La Encarnación, General Díaz, San Roque and Ricardo Brugada (La Chacarita). It was named after the cathedral of Asunción.

It is believed that after the great fire that affected Asunción in 1543, the enclave of Catedral of Asunción still remains the same, despite having modifications in its structure during the years (the last one being in 1850 under the presidency of Carlos Antonio López).

This barrio is home to several tourist attractions such as the old building of the National Congress known as "Cabildo de Asunción" (which today serves as a museum), the Independencia Plaza, the colonial post-office building, the Panteón Nacional de los Héroes (a place where most of the national heroes are entombed), the National Bank of Fomento (neoclassical building that resembles Buckingham Palace in small scale), the Casa de la Independencia Museum and the Uruguayan Plaza.

== Sources ==
- Los barrios de Asunción. Municipalidad de Asunción
- Geografía del Paraguay. Editorial Aramí Grupo Empresarial
