= Rock Lake =

Rock Lake is the name of several locations:

== United States ==
- Rock Lake (White Cloud Mountains), Idaho
- Rock Lake (Lyon County, Minnesota)
- Rock Lake (Cass County, Minnesota)
- Rock Lake Township, Lyon County, Minnesota
- Rock Lake (Arietta, Hamilton County, New York)
- Rock Lake, Indian Lake, New York
- Rock Lake Mountain, Benson, New York
- Rock Lake (Washington)
- Rock Lake (Wisconsin)

== Canada ==
- Rock Lake (Alberta)
- Rock Lake (Manitoba)
- Rock Lake (electoral district), Manitoba
- Rock Lake (Ontario)
- Rock Lake (Algonquin Park)

== See also ==
- Rock Lake Village, Kanawha County, West Virginia
- Rock Lake Middle School, Seminole County, Florida, U.S.
- Rock Lake Pool, a former swimming pool in West Virginia
