= San Roque =

San Roque may refer to:

== People ==
- Saint Roch (14th century), French Catholic saint
- Roque González y de Santa Cruz (1576–1628), Spanish Catholic saint

== Places ==
=== Argentina ===
- San Roque, Corrientes, a city in Corrientes Province
- San Roque Department, a department of Corrientes Province
- San Roque Lake, an artificial lake in Córdoba
- Aguada San Roque, a village and municipality in Neuquén Province

=== Costa Rica ===
- San Roque District, Barva, Heredia
- San Roque District, Grecia, Alajuela

=== Paraguay ===
- San Roque (Asunción), a neighborhood of Asunción
- San Roque González de Santa Cruz, a district in Paraguarí Department

=== Peru ===
- San Roque de Cumbaza, a town in the San Martín Region
- San Roque de Cumbaza District, a district of Lamas
- San Roque, a neighborhood in Santiago de Surco, Lima

=== Philippines ===
- San Roque, a barangay of the municipality of Angono in the Rizal province
- San Roque, Northern Samar, a municipality
- San Roque, a barangay in Gapan, Nueva Ecija
- San Roque, a barangay in Navotas, Metro Manila
- San Roque, a barangay in Pateros, Metro Manila
- San Roque, a barangay in Quezon City, Metro Manila
- Sitio San Roque, a sitio in Bagong Pag-asa, Quezon City, Metro Manila
- San Roque, a barangay in Santo Tomas, Batangas
- San Roque, a barangay in Tubajon, Dinagat Islands
- San Roque, a barangay in Zamboanga City
- San Roque West, Agoo, La Union

=== Spain ===
- San Roque, O Vicedo, a village in San Miguel das Negradas, Galicia
- San Roque, Spain, a municipality in Cádiz, Andalusia
- San Roque de Riomiera, a municipality in Cantabria

=== Other places ===
- San Roque Lake (Bolivia), a lake in Iténez Province, Beni Department
- San Roque, Antioquia, Colombia, a municipality
- San Roque, Quito, Ecuador, an electoral parish or district
- San Roque, Saipan, Northern Mariana Islands, a village
- San Roque, Santa Barbara, California, US, a residential neighborhood

== Other uses ==
- Battle of San Roque, an 1829 battle of the Argentine Civil War
- CD San Roque, a football club in San Roque, Cadiz, Andalusia, Spain
- CD San Roque de Lepe, a football club in Lepe, Andalusia, Spain
- Club de Rugby San Roque, a rugby union club in Valencia, Spain
- San Roque Club, a country club in San Roque, Andalusia
- San Roque railway station, in San Roque, Andalusia

== See also ==
- Roque (disambiguation)
- San Roque Dam (disambiguation)
- São Roque (disambiguation)
