= Laroque =

Laroque may refer to the following communes in France:

- Laroque, Gironde, in the Gironde department
- Laroque, Hérault, in the Hérault department
- Laroque-d'Olmes, in the Ariège department
- Laroque-de-Fa, in the Aude department
- Laroque-des-Albères, in the Pyrénées-Orientales department
- Laroque-des-Arcs, in the Lot department
- Laroque-Timbaut, in the Lot-et-Garonne department

== See also ==
- Larroque (disambiguation)
- La Roque (disambiguation)
- Larock (disambiguation)
