= Roques =

Roques may refer to:

== Places ==
- Roques, Gers, a commune in France
- Roques, Haute-Garonne, a commune in France
- Roques de Anaga, two monuments of Tenerife, Canary Islands, Spain
- La Roque-d'Anthéron, a commune in the Bouches-du-Rhône department in southern France
- Los Roques archipelago, a federal dependency of Venezuela
- Los Roques Airport, a small domestic airport on the El Gran Roque island in the Los Roques archipelago

== Other uses ==
- 5643 Roques, a Main-belt asteroid

== People with the surname Roques ==
- Claude Roques (1912–2003), French field hockey player
- Clément-Emile Roques (1880-1964), French Cardinal of the Roman Catholic Church
- Jacques Roques, Swiss aviator
- Guillaume-Joseph Roques (1757–1847), French painter
- Léon Roques (1839–1923), French transcriber
- Pierre Roques (1856–1920), French general
- Serge Roques (born 1947), French politician
- Tony Roques (born 1978), English rugby union football player

== See also ==
- Roque (disambiguation)
- Rocks (disambiguation)
- ROCS (disambiguation)
- ROKS (disambiguation)
