= USS Kinzer =

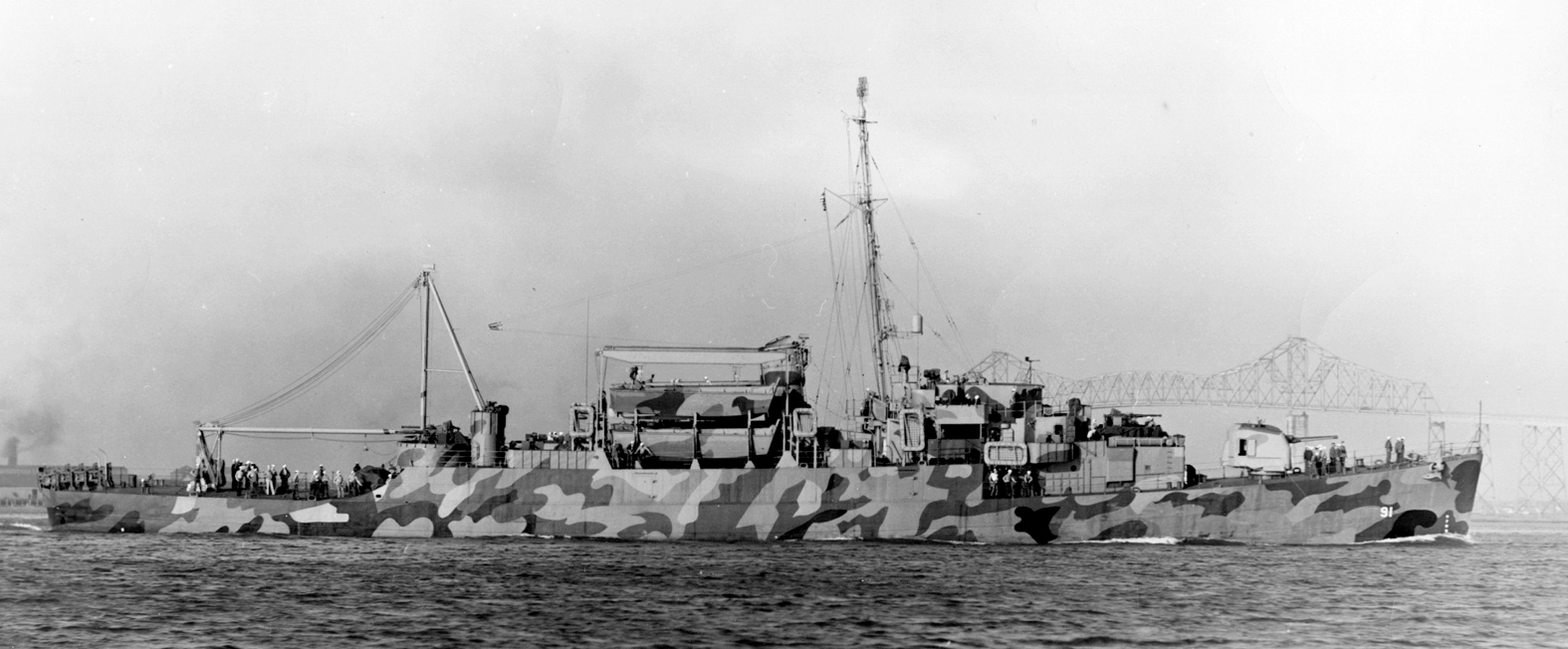

History

United States
- Name: USS Kinzer (DE-232)
- Namesake: Edward B. Kinzer
- Builder: Charleston Navy Yard
- Laid down: 9 September 1943 as Rudderow-class destroyer escort
- Launched: 9 December 1943
- Sponsored by: Mrs. Charles E. Kinzer
- Reclassified: APD-91, 17 July 1944
- Commissioned: 1 November 1944
- Decommissioned: 18 December 1946
- Stricken: 1 March 1965
- Honors and awards: 1 battle star for World War II service; China Service Medal
- Fate: Sold to the Republic of China, 21 April 1965

History

Taiwan
- Name: ROCS Yu Shan (Chinese: 玉山; DE-32)
- Reclassified: PF-32

General characteristics
- Class & type: Crosley-class high speed transport
- Displacement: 2,130 long tons (2,164 t) full
- Length: 306 ft (93 m)
- Beam: 37 ft (11 m)
- Draft: 12 ft 7 in (3.84 m)
- Speed: 23 knots (43 km/h; 26 mph)
- Troops: 162
- Complement: 204
- Armament: 1 × 5 in (130 mm) gun; 6 × 40 mm guns; 6 × 20 mm guns; 2 × depth charge tracks

USS Kinzer (APD-91), ex-DE-232, was a United States Navy high-speed transport in commission from 1944 to 1946.

== Namesake ==
Edward Blaine Kinzer was born on 22 August 1917 in Rock, West Virginia. He enlisted in the United States Naval Reserve on 26 February 1941, was appointed Aviation Cadet on 3 April 1941, and was commissioned as an ensign on 20 October 1941. On 12 November 1941 he was assigned to Scouting Squadron 5 on board the aircraft carrier USS Yorktown as a Douglas SBD Dauntless dive bomber pilot.

Kinzer flew with Scouting Squadron 5 in the Battle of the Coral Sea. He contributed to the sinking or damaging of eight Japanese vessels in Tulagi Harbor on 4 May 1942 and the sinking of the Imperial Japanese Navy aircraft carrier Shōhō on 7 May 1942. On 8 May 1942, while piloting his dive bomber on anti-torpedo plane patrol during the battle, he died while engaging Japanese aircraft. He was posthumously awarded the Navy Cross.

== Construction and commissioning ==
Kinzer was laid down as the Rudderow-class destroyer escort USS Kinzer (DE-232) on 9 September 1943 by the Charleston Navy Yard and launched as such on 9 December 1943, sponsored by Mrs. Charles E. Kinzer, mother of the ship's namesake. The ship was reclassified as a Crosley-class high speed transport and redesignated APD-91 on 17 July 1944. After conversion to her new role, the ship was commissioned on 11 November 1944.

== Service history ==
=== World War II ===
Kinzer departed Norfolk, Virginia, on 1 January 1945, transited the Panama Canal and docked at San Diego, California, on 16 January 1945. On 18 January 1945 she departed for San Francisco, California, then moved on to Pearl Harbor, Territory of Hawaii, where she arrived on 29 January 1945.

At Pearl Harbor, Kinzer embarked U.S. Marines of the Reconnaissance Battalion, Fleet Marine Force, and departed on 12 February 1945 for World War II service in the Pacific war zone. She arrived at Okinawa Gunto for her preinvasion mission on 26 March 1945 escorting tank landing ships (LSTs) to their landings on Kerama Retto. When night came, Kinzer landed marines on the various small islands surrounding Okinawa to gather data on terrain and Japanese activity; later large American guns set up on these islands aided the initial assault of Okinawa itself.

Kinzer, in company with fast transport USS Scribner (APD-122), continued this pattern while dodging Japanese kamikaze suicide planes during patrols and antisubmarine-screen duty in the Okinawa campaign until she departed on 15 July 1945 with a convoy headed for Guam. There she picked up the escort aircraft carrier USS Sargent Bay (CVE-83), escorted Sargent Bay to Pearl Harbor. and continued on to the United States West Coast, arriving at San Pedro, California, on 9 August 1945. World War II ended six days later.

=== Postwar ===
Completing overhaul, Kinzer departed San Pedro on 6 September 1945, disembarked passengers at Pearl Harbor, Guam, and Ulithi Atoll, and arrived at Manila on Luzon in the Philippine Islands on 13 October 1945. On 23 October 1945 she departed for Haiphong, French Indochina, where she embarked Chinese troops for transfer to northern China. From 7 November 1945 to 22 April 1946, Kinzer redeployed Chinese troops in northern China and called at the ports of Chinwangtao, Qingdao, and Taku in China, Hulutao in Manchuria, and Jinsen, Korea. During this time, she served as flagship for Commander, Landing Ship Tank Flotilla 15.

Kinzer cleared Qingdao on 25 April 1946 for the United States, calling at Guam and Pearl Harbor en route and arriving at San Pedro on 17 May 1946.

== Decommissioning and disposal ==
Kinzer was decommissioned on 18 December 1946 and entered the Pacific Reserve Fleet at San Diego. Later she was moved to San Francisco.

Kinzer was stricken from the Navy List on 1 March 1965, and on 21 April 1965 was sold to the Republic of China under the Military Assistance Program. She was commissioned by the Republic of China Navy as a frigate, serving as ROCS Yu Shan (PF-32) and receiving a second single 5" turreted gun aft. Her landing craft davits were also replaced with a Sea Chaparral surface-to-air missile launcher in 1983. Yu Shan is known have remained active as a fisheries patrol vessel as recently as 1998.

== Honors and awards ==
Kinzer received one battle star for her service in World War II and the China Service Medal.
