= Roque (given name) =

Roque is a given name. It is the Spanish and Portuguese version of the Italian Rocco. Notable persons with that name include:

- Roque (footballer) (born 1973), Brazilian football player
- Roque Alfaro (born 1956), Argentine football player and manager
- Roque Antonio Adames Rodríguez (1928–2009), Dominican Republic Roman Catholic bishop
- Roque Avallay (1945–2026), Argentine football player
- Roque Balduque (died 1561), Spanish sculptor and maker of altarpieces
- Roque Cordero (1917–2008), Panamanian-American composer
- Roque Dalton (1935–1975), Salvadoran poet
- Roque de la Cruz (1580–1644), Irish Dominican prelate and Tridentine reformist
- Roque De La Fuente Guerra (born 1954), American businessman and 2016 presidential candidate
- Roque Esteban Scarpa (1914–1995), Chilean writer, literary critic and scholar
- Roque Estrada Reynoso (1883–1966), Mexican lawyer, journalist and writer
- Roque Fernández (born 1947), Argentine economist and politician
- Roque Funes (1897–1981), Argentine cinematographer
- Roque González Garza (1885–1962), Mexican general and politician
- Roque Júnior (born 1976), Brazilian football player
- Roque Máspoli (1917–2004), Uruguayan football player and coach
- Roque Olsen (1925–1992), Argentine football player and manager
- Roque Pinto, Indian doctor
- Roque Ponce (late 17th century), Spanish painter
- Roque Ruaño (1877–1935), Spanish priest-civil engineer
- Roque Sáenz Peña (1851–1914), Argentine politician
- Roque Santa Cruz (born 1981), Paraguayan football player
- Dom Roque Tello de Menezes, Portuguese nobleman
- Roque Vallejos (1943–2006), Paraguayan poet, psychiatrist and essayist
- Roque "Rocky" Versace, (1937–1965), American soldier

== See also ==
- Roque (disambiguation)
