= Roque (disambiguation) =

Roque is an American variant of croquet played on a hard smooth surface.

Roque may also refer to:

- Roque (given name), a given name (including a list of people with the name)
- Roque (surname), a surname (including a list of people with the name)
- USS Roque (AG-137), a Camano-class cargo ship constructed for the U.S. Army

== See also ==
- La Roque (disambiguation)
- San Roque (disambiguation)
- São Roque (disambiguation)
- Roques (disambiguation)
- Rok (disambiguation)
- Roc (disambiguation)
- Rock (disambiguation)
- ROQ
