= Rock =

Rock most often refers to:

- Rock (geology), a naturally occurring solid aggregate of minerals or mineraloids
- Rock music, a genre of popular music

Rock or Rocks may also refer to:

== Places ==
- Rock (landform), a type of islet

=== United Kingdom ===
- Rock, Caerphilly, a location in Wales
- Rock, Cornwall, a village in England
- Rock, County Tyrone, a village in Northern Ireland
- Rock, Devon, a location in England
- Rock, Neath Port Talbot, a location in Wales
- Rock, Northumberland, a village in England
- Rock, Somerset, a location in England
- Rock, West Sussex, a hamlet in Washington, England
- Rock, Worcestershire, a village and civil parish in England

=== United States ===
- Rock, Kansas, an unincorporated community
- Rock, Michigan, an unincorporated community
- Rock, West Virginia, an unincorporated community
- Rock, Rock County, Wisconsin, a town in southern Wisconsin
- Rock, Wood County, Wisconsin, a town in central Wisconsin

=== Elsewhere ===
- Corregidor, an island in the Philippines also known as "The Rock"
- Jamaica, an island in the Caribbean is locally referred to as the "Rock"
- Niue, an island near Tonga referred to as the "Rock" by residents
- Rock of Gibraltar, a British overseas territory near the southernmost tip of Spain

== People ==
- Rock (name), a list of people with the surname, first name or nickname
- Rock (rapper) (born Jamal Bush in 1975), American rapper
- Man Mountain Rock, later ring name used by professional wrestler Maxx Payne
- Rock aka Blade Runner Rock, early ring name used by The Ultimate Warrior while as a member of the Blade Runners tag team
- The Rock, (born Dwayne Johnson in 1972), American actor and wrestler

== Arts, entertainment, and media ==
=== Fictional characters ===
- Rock (comics), a character in the DC Comics universe
- Rock (manga), a recurring, major character in most of Osamu Tezuka's manga series
- Rock Howard, the playable character in Garou: Mark of the Wolves
- Mega Man (character), also called Rock, from the Mega Man series
- Chuck Rock, the playable character in the 1991 self-titled side-scrolling platform video game
- Sgt. Rock, a DC Comics character
- Rocks D. Xebec, from One Piece
- Rock, from Rock Paper Scissors

=== Music ===
==== Albums ====
- Rock (album), by Pleymo (2003)
- Rock!!!!!, by Violent Femmes (1995)
- R.O.C.K., by Kirka (1986)
- Rock (Casting Pearls EP) (2002)
- Rocks (Aerosmith album) (1976)
- Rocks (Harem Scarem album) (2001)

==== Songs ====
- "Rocks" (song), by Primal Scream (1994)
- "Rock", by Groove Coverage from 21st Century (2006)
- "Rock", by Lemon Jelly from the single "Soft/Rock" (2001)
- "Rock", by Joe Morris from Singularity (2001)
- "Rocks", by Dry Cleaning from Secret Love (2026)
- "Rocks", by Imagine Dragons from Night Visions (2012)

==== Other uses in music ====
- Rock music, a genre of popular music
- Rock (magazine), a 1982–1990 Yugoslav music magazine
- Rock Records, a Taiwanese record label founded in 1980

=== Literature ===
- Rock, a 1953 novel by Hal Ellson
- Rock (magazine), a 1982–1990 Yugoslav music magazine

=== Other uses in arts, entertainment, and media ===
- Rocks (film), a 2019 British coming-of-age drama movie
- Rocks (Das Rad), a 2001 German animated short film
- Uprock or rock, a form of street dance

== Computing ==
- Rock (processor), a microprocessor by Sun Microsystems
- Rocks Cluster Distribution, Linux distribution for cluster computing
- .rocks

== Food ==
- Rock (confectionery), a type of stick-shaped boiled sugar confectionery
- Rock candy, also known as sugar candy or rock sugar
- Rock salmon, often referred to as rock

== Slang ==
- Crack cocaine before being smoked, known as rock
- Diamond, or rock
- Gemstone, or rock
- Rocks, ice cubes in alcoholic drinks

== Sports ==
- Colorado Rockies Major League Baseball team, nicknamed "Rocks"
- Toronto Rock, of the National Lacrosse League
- Rock (ski course) in China, the downhill course for the 2022 Winter Olympics

== Other uses ==
- Alcatraz Prison, nicknamed "The Rock"
- Distaff, a tool used in spinning
- ROCK1, a human gene
- USS Rock (SS/SSR/AGSS-274), a US Navy submarine
- ROCKS (missile), an Israeli air-to-surface missile

== See also ==
- The Rock (disambiguation)
- Rock County (disambiguation)
- Rock Creek (disambiguation)
- Rock Island (disambiguation)
- Rock Lake (disambiguation)
- Rock River (disambiguation)
- Rock Mountain (disambiguation)
- Rock Township (disambiguation)
- Criminal rock throwing
- ROC (disambiguation)
- ROCK (disambiguation)
- Rockey (disambiguation)
- Rockies (disambiguation)
- Rocky (disambiguation)
- Rok (disambiguation)
- Roque (disambiguation)
- Rox (disambiguation)
