= Roque (surname) =

Roque is a Spanish and Portuguese surname or Germanic origin. Notable people with the surname include:

- Abby Roque (born 1997), American ice hockey player
- Ademir Roque Kaefer (born 1960), Brazilian football player
- Alphonse Roque-Ferrier (1844–1907), French philologist
- Ana Roque de Duprey (1853–1933), Puerto Rican educator and suffragist
- Bruno Roque de Sousa (born 1989), Brazilian football player
- Carlos Roque (1936–2006), Portuguese comics artist
- Christine Roque (born 1965) French singer
- Dominic Roque (born 1990), Filipino actor and model
- Edgardo Roque (1938–2026), Filipino Olympic basketball player
- Felipe Pérez Roque (born 1965), Cuban politician
- Francis Xavier Roque (1928–2019), American Roman Catholic bishop
- Frank Roque (1959–2022), American convicted murderer
- Harry Roque (born 1966), Filipino lawyer and former law professor
- Hélio Roque (born 1985), Portuguese football player
- Horácio Roque (1944–2010), Portuguese financier and businessman
- Humberto Roque Villanueva (born 1943), Mexican politician
- Jacinto Roque de Sena Pereira (1784–1850), Portuguese sailor
- Jacqueline Roque (1927–1986), French model
- Joao Roque (born 1971), Angolan mixed martial arts fighter
- Juan Roque (born 1974), American football player
- Laarni Roque, Filipino politician
- Maicon Pereira Roque (born 1988), Brazilian football player
- Marian P. Roque, Filipina mathematician
- Mariano Roque Alonzo (died 1853), Paraguayan politician
- Marta Beatriz Roque (born 1945), Cuban political dissident
- Miki Roque (born 1988), Spanish football player
- Nuno Roque, Portuguese actor and singer
- Rafael Roque (born 1972), Dominican baseball player
- Randolph Roque Calvo, American Roman Catholic bishop
- Romário Roque (born 1998), Colombian basketballer

== See also ==
- Roque (disambiguation)
