= Larock =

Larock is a surname. Notable people with the surname include:

- Victor Larock (1904–1977), Belgian socialist politician
- Yves Larock (born 1977), Swiss DJ and producer

== See also ==
- Laroque (disambiguation)
- Larroque (disambiguation)
