= ROKS =

ROKS or variant may refer to:

- Republic of Korea Ship, see Republic of Korea Navy
- ROKS flamethrowers
- Roks, or Rakúsy, a town in Slovakia
- Roks, a radio station in Belarus, see List of radio stations in Belarus
- Roks, a radio station in Ukraine, see List of radio stations in Ukraine
- National Organisation for Women's Shelters and Young Women's Shelters in Sweden

== See also ==
- Rok (disambiguation)
- ROCS (disambiguation)
- Roques (disambiguation)
