= USS Scribner =

United States Navy high-speed transport

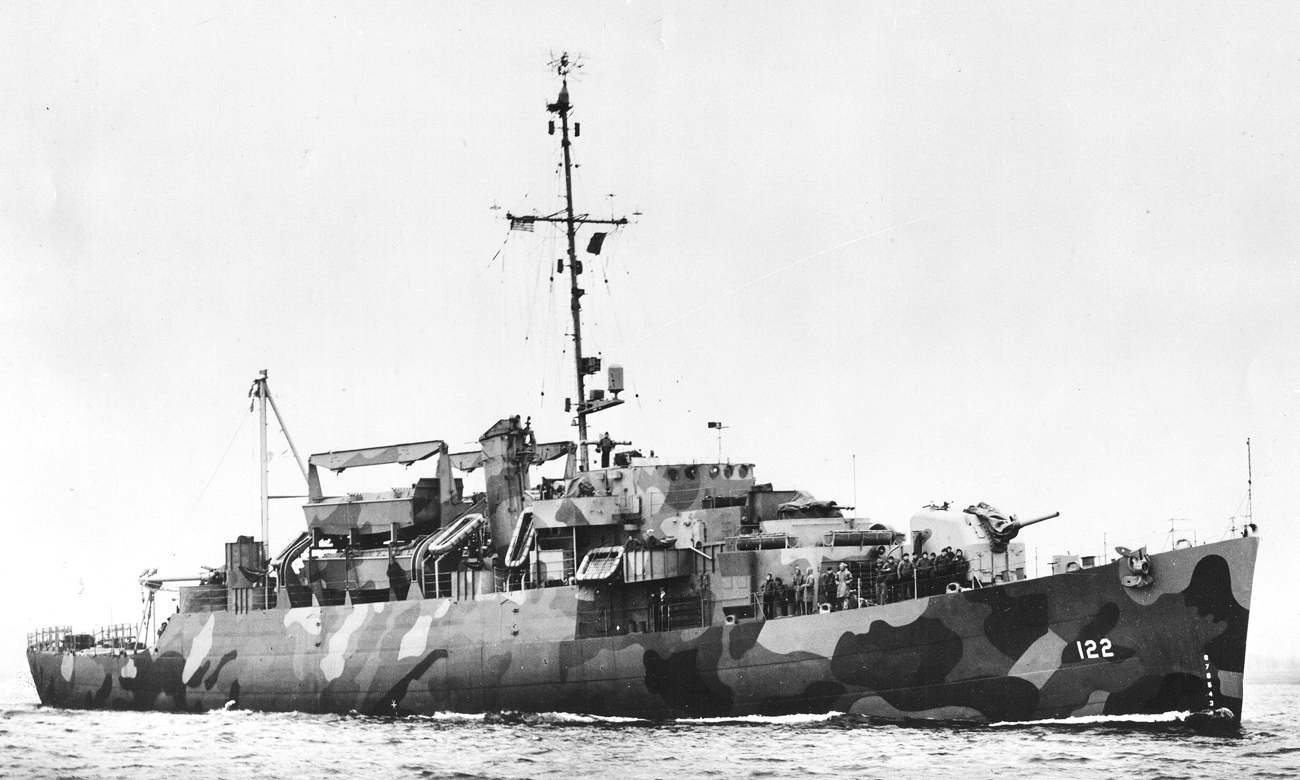

History

United States
- Name: USS Scribner
- Namesake: James M. Scribner (1920–1941)
- Builder: Bethlehem Shipbuilding Company, Quincy, Massachusetts
- Laid down: 29 June 1944
- Launched: 1 August 1944
- Sponsored by: Mrs. Theresa J. Scribner
- Commissioned: 20 November 1944
- Decommissioned: 15 November 1946
- Reclassified: From destroyer escort (DE-689) to high-speed transport (APD-122) 17 July 1944
- Stricken: 1 August 1966
- Honors and awards: One battle star for World War II service
- Fate: Sold for scrapping 6 September 1967
- Notes: Laid down as Rudderow-class destroyer escort USS Scribner (DE-689)

General characteristics
- Class & type: Crosley-class high speed transport
- Displacement: 2,130 long tons (2,164 t) full
- Length: 306 ft (93 m)
- Beam: 37 ft (11 m)
- Draft: 12 ft 7 in (3.84 m)
- Speed: 23 knots (43 km/h; 26 mph)
- Troops: 162
- Complement: 204
- Armament: 1 × 5 in (130 mm) gun; 6 × 40 mm guns; 6 × 20 mm guns; 2 × depth charge tracks

USS Scribner (APD-122), ex-DE-689, was a United States Navy high-speed transport in commission from 1944 to 1946.

== Namesake ==
James M. Scribner was born on 25 June 1920 at Stevens Point, Wisconsin. He enlisted in the U.S. Navy in 1940. Assigned to Patrol Squadron 101, Radioman Third Class Scribner was killed in action during an attack on Imperial Japanese Navy forces and shore installations on Jolo Island in the Philippine Islands on 26 December 1941. He was posthumously awarded the Air Medal.

== Construction and commissioning ==
Scribner was laid down as the Rudderow-class destroyer escort USS Scribner (DE-689) on 29 June 1944 by the Bethlehem Shipbuilding Company at Quincy, Massachusetts, and was reclassified as a Crosley-class high-speed transport and redesignated APD-122 on 17 July 1944. She was launched on 1 August 1944, sponsored by Mrs. Theresa J. Scribner, the mother of the ship's namesake. After conversion for her new role, she was commissioned on 20 November 1944.

== Service history ==
=== World War II ===
After shakedown, Scribner departed Norfolk, Virginia, on 12 January 1945, escorting the repair ship USS Vulcan to Panama and then proceeding to Pearl Harbor, Territory of Hawaii, where she arrived on 6 February 1945. She underwent training with her embarked underwater demolition team at Maui between 11 February 1945 and 13 February 1945, and then moved to Leyte in the Philippine Islands for further training.

Scribner arrived off Okinawa with the invasion force on 26 March 1945, and that night began underwater demolition team reconnaissance operations with her sister ship, the high-speed transport USS Kinzer, at Kerama Retto. Her embarked United States Marines also examined the Eastern Islands and Menna Shima before disembarking on Okinawa on 18 April 1945. Scribner then continued support to the Okinawa campaign, commencing patrol duty around the transport anchorage which lasted until 15 May 1945, when she departed Okinawa for upkeep at Guam.

Upkeep completed, Scribner returned to Okinawa on 7 June 1945 and resumed her patrol duty around the transport anchorage. She conducted an underwater demolition team survey of Kure Shima on 13 and 14 June 1945, then returned to patrol duty at the transport anchorage until 22 July 1945, when she departed to return to the United States to undergo underwater demolition team training for Operation Olympic, the planned November 1945 invasion of Kyūshū, Japan. However, the surrender of Japan ended World War II on 15 August 1945 – 14 August 1945 on the eastern side of the International Date Line in the United States—the day before she arrived in the United States, making the scheduled training unnecessary.

=== Postwar ===
Her training cancelled, Scribner instead underwent three weeks of overhaul at San Pedro, California. Upon its completion, she departed the United States West Coast on 7 September 1945 and, after making several logistics voyages in the Western Pacific, arrived at Manila on Luzon in the Philippine Islands on 19 October 1945.

Scribner was then assigned to escort a group of American transports which was to load Chinese troops at Haiphong, French Indochina, and disembark them at Dairen in north China to disarm Japanese troops in that area. Political difficulties delayed the convoy's departure from Manila until 30 October 1945, and the Chinese troops were finally disembarked at Qinhuangdao, China, an alternate location, on 12 November 1945. Scribner then escorted the transports to Taku on 14 November 1945, and served there as headquarters ship for the port director between 24 November and 4 December 1945, and as radio guardship there until 19 January 1946.

Scribner moved to Qingdao, China, on 20 January 1946, and departed for Haiphong on 21 March 1946. She was relieved there on 11 April 1946 and began the long trip to the United States on 12 April 1946, arriving at Charleston, South Carolina, on 1 July 1946 for inactivation.

== Decommissioning and disposal ==
Scribner was decommissioned on 15 November 1946 and placed in reserve. She was stricken from the Naval Vessel Register on 1 August 1966 and sold on 6 September 1967 to Gregg, Gibson, and Gregg, Inc., of Miami, Florida, for scrapping.

== Honors and awards ==
Scribner received one battle star for World War II service.
