= Rock Lake Township, Lyon County, Minnesota =

Rock Lake Township, Minnesota
- Township
- Location within the state of Minnesota Rock Lake Township, Minnesota (the United States)
- Coordinates: 44°14′50″N 95°54′19″W
- Country: United States
- State: Minnesota
- County: Lyon

Area
  - Total: 34.6 sq mi (89.6 km^{2})
  - Land: 33.1 sq mi (85.8 km^{2})
  - Water: 1.5 sq mi (3.8 km^{2})
- Elevation: 1,585 ft (483 m)

Population (2000)
  - Total: 282
  - Density: 8.5/sq mi (3.3/km^{2})
- Time zone: UTC-6 (Central (CST))
  - Summer (DST): UTC-5 (CDT)
- FIPS code: 27-55042
- GNIS feature ID: 0665437

Rock Lake Township is a township in Lyon County, Minnesota, United States. The population was 282 at the 2000 census.

Rock Lake Township was organized in 1876, and named for Rock Lake.

== Geography ==
According to the United States Census Bureau, the township has a total area of 34.6 square miles (89.6 km^{2}), of which 33.1 square miles (85.8 km^{2}) is land and 1.5 square miles (3.8 km^{2}) (4.28%) is water.

== Demographics ==
As of the census of 2000, there were 282 people, 108 households, and 83 families residing in the township. The population density was 8.5 people per square mile (3.3/km^{2}). There were 113 housing units at an average density of 3.4/sq mi (1.3/km^{2}). The racial makeup of the township was 99.29% White, and 0.71% from two or more races.

There were 108 households, out of which 28.7% had children under the age of 18 living with them, 74.1% were married couples living together, 1.9% had a female householder with no husband present, and 23.1% were non-families. 21.3% of all households were made up of individuals, and 8.3% had someone living alone who was 65 years of age or older. The average household size was 2.61 and the average family size was 3.02.

In the township the population was spread out, with 20.9% under the age of 18, 10.3% from 18 to 24, 24.5% from 25 to 44, 30.5% from 45 to 64, and 13.8% who were 65 years of age or older. The median age was 42 years. For every 100 females, there were 115.3 males. For every 100 females age 18 and over, there were 112.4 males.

The median income for a household in the township was $40,000, and the median income for a family was $47,500. Males had a median income of $28,500 versus $20,139 for females. The per capita income for the township was $19,008. About 5.0% of families and 6.3% of the population were below the poverty line, including 8.2% of those under the age of eighteen and 4.3% of those 65 or over.
