= Larroque =

Larroque may refer to the following communes in France:

- Larroque, Haute-Garonne, in the Haute-Garonne department
- Larroque, Hautes-Pyrénées, in the Hautes-Pyrénées department
- Larroque, Tarn, in the Tarn department
- Larroque-Engalin, in the Gers department
- Larroque-Saint-Sernin, in the Gers department
- Larroque-sur-l'Osse, in the Gers department
- Larroque-Toirac, in the Lot department

Larroque may also refer to:

- Larroque, Entre Ríos, a town in Argentina

== See also ==
- Laroque (disambiguation)
- La Roque (disambiguation)
- Larock (disambiguation)
