= Rok =

ROK is an acronym for the Republic of Korea, commonly known as South Korea.

ROK, Rok or RoK may also refer to:

== Places ==
- Republic of Kosovo, the official name for Kosovo
- Republic of Kazakhstan, the official name for Kazakhstan
- Rök, a parish in Sweden

== Organizations ==
- Radio Okinawa, a radio station in Okinawa Prefecture, Japan
- Rockhampton Airport (IATA code)
- Rockwell Automation (ticker symbol)
- Rok plc, a British construction company that collapsed in 2010

== People ==
- Rok (given name), a Slovene masculine name includes list of name-holders
- Saint Roch (c. 1348–1376/79), Christian saint known as Rok in several languages
- Andy "Rok" Guerrero, former guitarist of Flobots

== Other uses ==
- Rok River, a river of Sweden
- Rise of Kingdoms, a mobile app real-time strategy game
- A misspelling of Rock (disambiguation)

== See also ==
- Roc (disambiguation)
- ROKS (disambiguation)
- Rokkk, a 2010 Indian film
