= São Roque =

São Roque (Portuguese for 'Saint Roch') may refer to:

== Places ==
=== Brazil ===
- São Roque, São Paulo
- São Roque de Minas, Minas Gerais state
- São Roque do Canaã, Espírito Santo state
- Cape São Roque, a headland in Rio Grande do Norte state

=== Portugal ===
- São Roque, a parish in the municipality of Oliveira de Azeméis

==== Azores ====
- São Roque, Ponta Delgada, São Miguel Island
- São Roque do Pico, a municipality
  - São Roque do Pico (parish)

==== Madeira ====
- São Roque (Funchal)
- São Roque do Faial, Santana

== See also ==
- Roque (disambiguation)
- San Roque (disambiguation)
- Boa Ventura de São Roque, a municipality in Paraná, Brazil
- Igreja de São Roque, in Lisbon, Portugal
