= Asunción Cathedral =

- Metropolitan Cathedral of Our Lady of the Assumption
- Catedral Metropolitana de Nuestra Señora de la Asunción
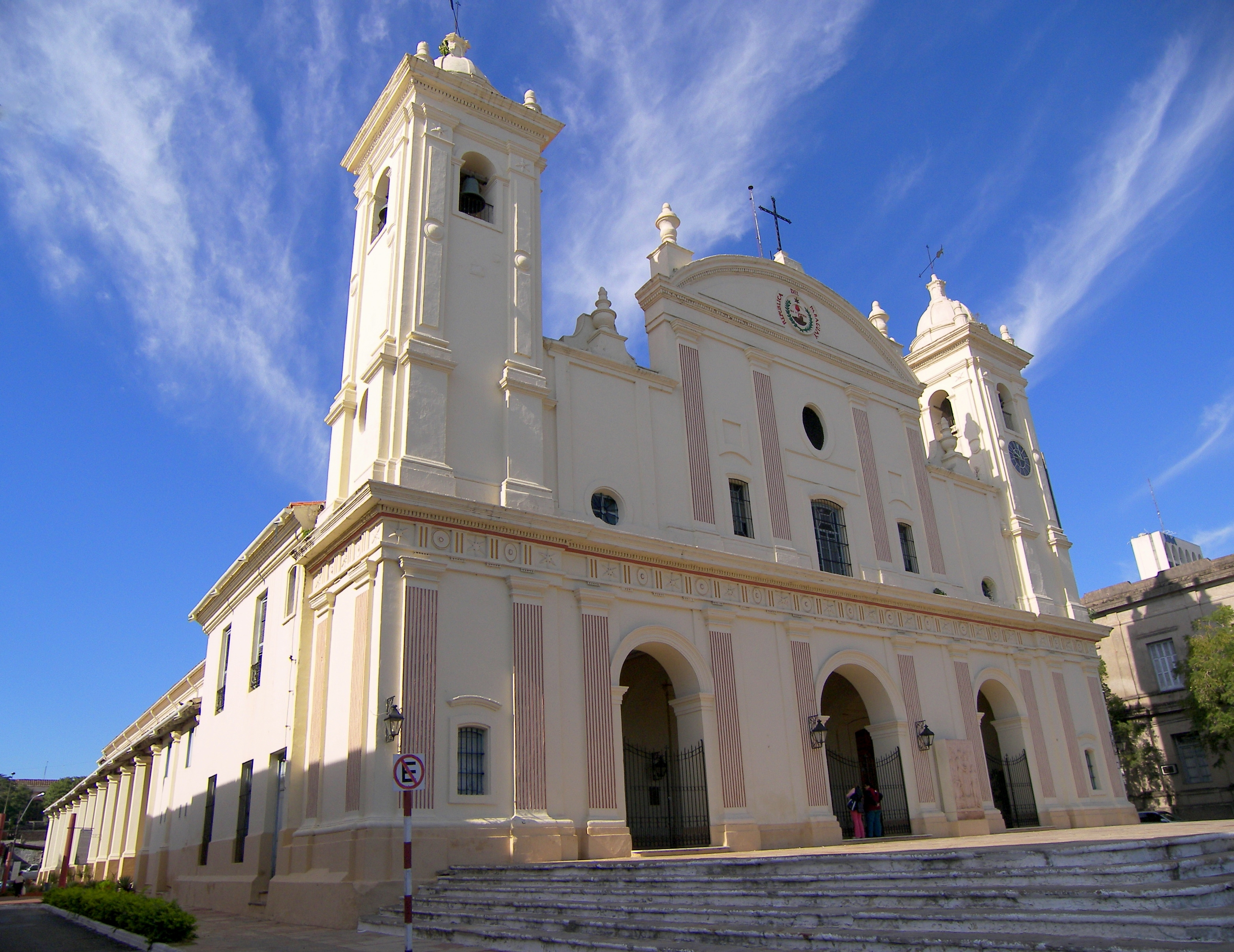
- View of the cathedral facade
- Asunción Cathedral
- 25.2816°S 57.6324°W
- Location: Asunción
- Country: Paraguay
- Denomination: Roman Catholic Church
- Sui iuris church: Latin Church

History
- Status: Cathedral
- Dedication: Assumption of Mary

Architecture
- Functional status: Active
- Style: Neoclassical
- Years built: 1842-1845
- Groundbreaking: 1842
- Completed: 1845

Administration
- Archdiocese: Archdiocese of Asunción

Clergy
- Archbishop: Adalberto Martínez Flores

The Metropolitan Cathedral of Our Lady of the Assumption (Spanish: Catedral Metropolitana de Nuestra Señora de la Asunción) (also called simply Asunción Cathedral) It is the main Catholic church in Asunción. It is located in the neighborhood La Catedral, in the historic center of the capital of Paraguay. It was the first diocese of the Río de la Plata.

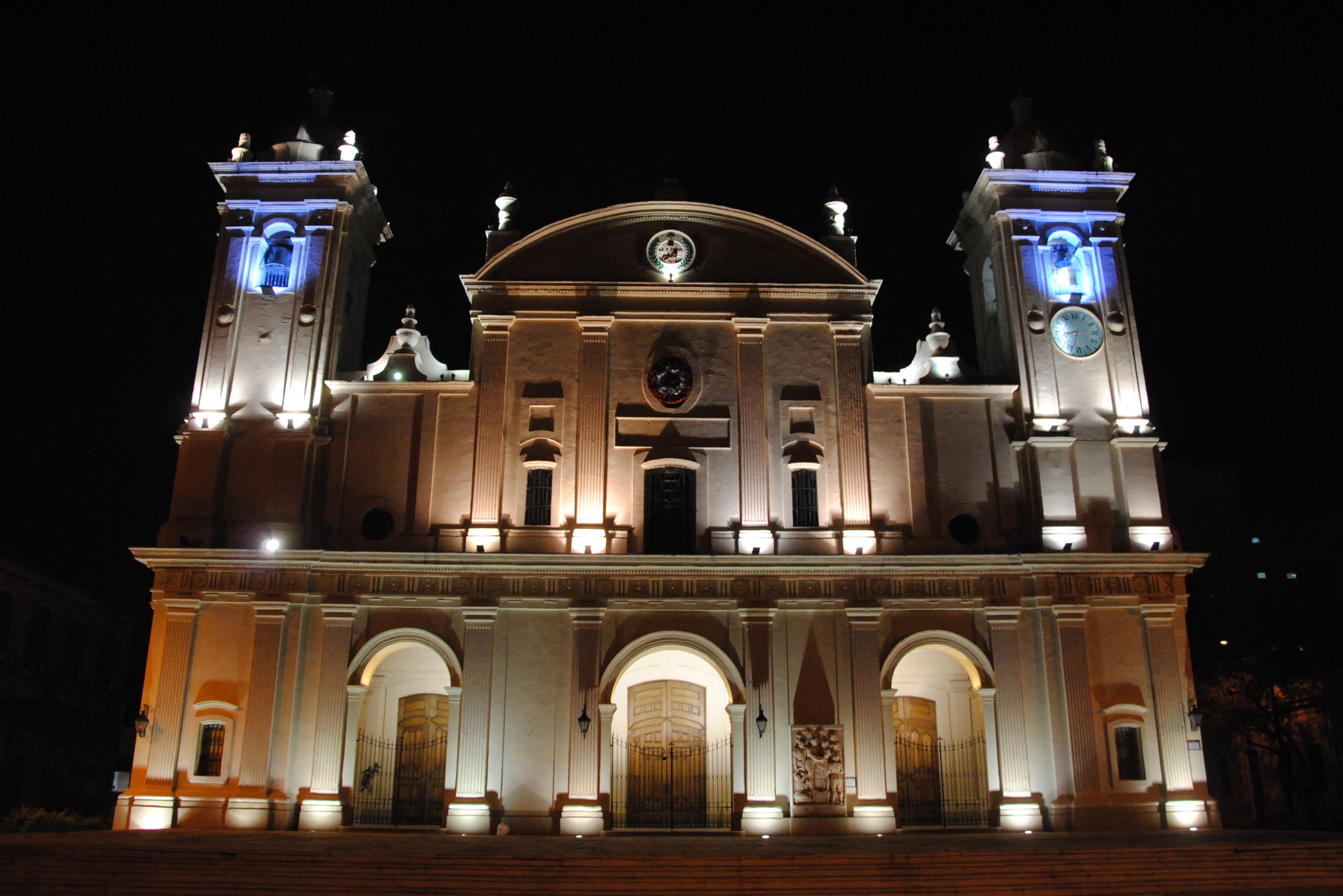
View of the cathedral at night

The latest version of the cathedral was built during the government of Don Carlos Antonio López and inaugurated in 1845. It is dedicated to Our Lady of the Assumption, the patroness of the country's capital city. It has a high altar coated in silver. The cathedral is the seat of the metropolitan archdiocese of Asunción (in Latin: Archidioecesis Sanctissimae Assumptionis).

== See also ==
- Roman Catholicism in Paraguay
