= Roc =

Roc, roc, ROC, or R.O.C. may refer to:

== People ==
- Roch (c. 1348 – 1376), Occitan saint called Roc in Catalan
- Agustí Roc (born 1971), Spanish ski mountaineer
- Margaret Roc (born 1945), Australian author
- Patricia Roc (1915–2003), British actress
- Roc Alexander (born 1981), American football player
- Roche Braziliano (fl. 1630–1671), also spelled Roc, Dutch pirate
- Roc Kirby (1918–2008), Australian businessman
- Roc Oliva (born 1989), Spanish field hockey player
- Roc Raida (1972–2009), American disc jockey, turntablist and producer
- Roc Riggio (born 2002), American baseball player
- Roc Taylor (born 2002), American football player
- Roc Thomas (born 1995), American football player
- The R.O.C. (rapper) (born 1973), American rapper
- Ste V Roc (born 1977), Irish hip-hop artist

== Places ==
- Republic of China, the official name of Taiwan
  - Republic of China (1912–1949), the internationally recognized government of China prior to the retreat of the Kuomintang to Taiwan and the establishment of the People's Republic of China by the Chinese Communist Party
- Republic of the Congo, the official name of a Central African country
- Republic of Cyprus, the official name of Cyprus
- Rest of Canada, term for everywhere in Canada outside Quebec
- Roč, a town in Croatia
- Le Roc, a commune in France
- Ross and Cromarty, registration county in Scotland, Chapman code
- Republic of Crimea (Russia), a disputed Russian republic
- Republic of Cuba, the official name of Cuba
- Roc (Gran Paradiso), a mountain in Italy

== Companies and organizations ==
- Radar Operations Center, US National Weather Service unit
- Regional Organisations of Councils, voluntary groupings of neighbouring councils in Australia
- Registrar of Companies, India
- Remote Operations Center, a National Security Agency facility in Fort Meade, Maryland
- Restaurant Opportunities Center, a union-supported labor group
- Resuscitation Outcomes Consortium, a network of clinical trial sites
- Right of Centre, a short-lived New Zealand political party
- Roc-A-Fella Records, known as "the Roc"
- Roc Books, a paperback science fiction and fantasy imprint of Penguin Group
- Roc Nation, an American entertainment company
- Roc Oil Company, based in Sydney, Australia
- RoC Skincare, skincare brand known for being the first to formulate stabilized retinol
- Royal Observer Corps, a former British civil defence organisation
- Romanian Orthodox Church
- Russian Orthodox Church

== Entertainment ==
- R.O.C. (band), British electronica group founded in 1983 by Fred Browning and Patrick Nicholson
- Roc (Dungeons & Dragons), a role-playing version of the mythical bird
- "Roc" (Nâdiya song), 2006
- Roc (The-Dream song)
- Roc (TV series), an American sitcom which aired 1991–94
- "The R.O.C.", a song by Jay-Z from The Dynasty: Roc La Familia (2000)

== Finance ==
- Rate of change (technical analysis)
- Return of capital
- Return on capital
- Return on costs

== Mathematics ==
- Radius of curvature (optics)
- Receiver operating characteristic, ROC curve (statistics)
- Radius of convergence

== Transport and vehicles ==
- Rail operating centre, a type of railway signalling centre in the UK
- Rate of climb, in aviation
- Greater Rochester International Airport (IATA airport code ROC), Rochester, Monroe County, New York State, USA
- Roche railway station (station code ROC), Roche, Cornwall, England, UK
- "Roc" (N351SL), the first (and only) Scaled Composites Stratolaunch (Model 351), an aircraft designed to carry air-launch-to-orbit rockets
- Blackburn Roc, a British naval fighter-bomber and turret fighter aircraft of World War II

== Sports ==
- Russian Olympic Committee
  - ROC, the IOC code used for Russian Olympic Committee athletes:
    - Russian Olympic Committee athletes at the 2020 Summer Olympics
    - Russian Olympic Committee athletes at the 2022 Winter Olympics
- Race of Champions (disambiguation)
  - Race of Champions, motorsport event combining track and rally drivers
  - Race of Champions (modified racing), a yearly stock car race using modified race cars
- Roc, the name of the University of Pittsburgh's costumed panther mascot (see Panthers of Pittsburgh)
- ROC, the IOC code formerly used for Republic of China at the Olympics 1924–1948

== Other uses ==
- Roc (mythology), a mythical giant bird
- Roglai language (ISO 639 language code roc)
- Renewables Obligation certificates, used in the UK's electricity supply industry
- Republic of Chocolate
- Resource-oriented computing
- Rocuronium bromide, colloquially called "roc" or "ROC"

== See also ==
- Rock (disambiguation)
- ROCS (disambiguation)
- Rok (disambiguation)
- Roque (disambiguation)
