= La Encarnación (Asunción) =

Coordinates: 25°17′S 57°38′W

- Barrio
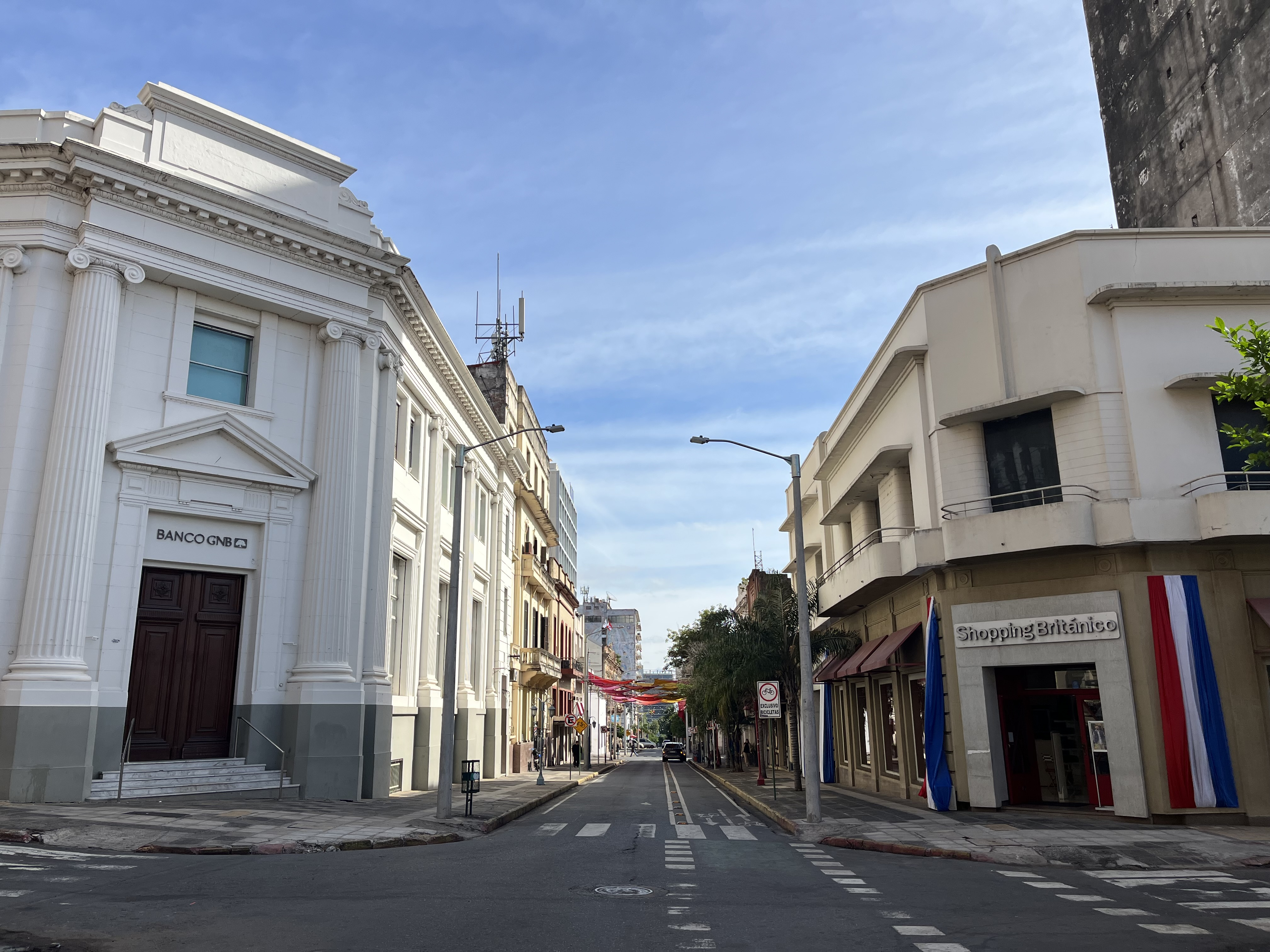
- Interactive map of La Encarnación
- Country: Paraguay
- Autonomous Capital District: Gran Asunción
- City: Asunción

La Encarnación is a neighbourhood (barrio) of Asunción, the capital and largest city of Paraguay.
