= Roque Pinto =

Indian physician

Roque Pinto, also known as Roque Gabriel Wiseman Pinto, is a prominent Indian doctor. He was the president of the Indian Academy of Cytologists and professor and head of the pathology dept in Goa Medical College, professor in charge of the Medical Education Cell, President of the Goa Association of Pathologists. He is also the president of the Saint Luke's medical guild in Goa. He is invited nationally and internationally for conferences. He is also examiner for the national board and other universities, and an inspector of the MCI. Dr. Pinto organised the international CME (Continuing Medical Education) program in pathology at the Goa Medical College on from 14 to 16 March 2008.
