= Rock Mountain =

Rock Mountain could refer to these places in the United States of America:

- Rock Mountain (Georgia)
- Rock Mountain (Washington state), in the Central Cascade Range
- Rock Mountain (Wyoming), Albany County, Wyoming
