= Rock Lake (Cass County, Minnesota) =

Lake in Minnesota, United States

Rock lake
- Location within Minnesota Location within the United States
- Location: Fairview Township, Cass County, north of Pillager, Minnesota
- Coordinates: 46.427189°N 94.473618°W
- Basin countries: United States
- Max. depth: 22 ft (6.7 m)

Rock Lake is a lake located in Cass County, Minnesota, USA. It has an area of 240 acres (0.97 km^{2}) and a water clarity of 3.5 ft (1.1 m) with a maximum depth of 22 feet (6.7 m). A smaller lake branches from it, with a smaller stream flowing into it.

Rock Lake is weedy and a habitat for Northern Pike and Large Mouth Bass. It is available for recreational activities such as swimming, boating and fishing.
