= The Rock =

The Rock most often refers to:

- Dwayne Johnson (born 1972), American actor, businessman, and professional wrestler known as The Rock
- The Rock (film), 1996, starring Sean Connery and Nicolas Cage, directed by Michael Bay

The Rock or The Rocks may also refer to:

== Places ==
=== Australia ===
- The Rock, New South Wales, a town
- The Rocks, New South Wales, a Sydney suburb

=== Canada ===
- "The Rock", a commonly used nickname for Newfoundland (island)
- The Rocks or Hopewell Rocks, New Brunswick, a coastal formation in Canada

=== United States ===
- The Rock (Michigan State University), a boulder on the campus of Michigan State University
- The Rock (University of Michigan), a landmark near the campus of the University of Michigan
- The Rock (Northwestern University), a landmark at Northwestern University in Evanston, Illinois
- The Rock (University of Tennessee), a landmark at the University of Tennessee, Knoxville
- The Rock, Georgia, an unincorporated community
- The Rock, a volcanic rock that is the namesake of Castle Rock, Washington
- The Rock, or Alcatraz Island, small island in San Francisco Bay, California
- The Rock, Carolina Panthers training facility in Rock Hill, South Carolina
- The Rocks (New Hampshire), estate, in Bethlehem, New Hampshire
- The Rocks (Jefferson County, West Virginia), a historic place in Jefferson County, West Virginia
- "The Rocks", or McKees Rocks, Pennsylvania, a borough
- Rockingham Speedway, a race track formerly used for the NASCAR Cup Series

=== Elsewhere ===
- Ayers Kaserne, a closed U.S. Army Cold War military post in Kirch-Göns, Germany
- Bermuda, often referred to by islanders as The Rock
- Gibraltar, often referred to as The Rock, from the Rock of Gibraltar
- Corregidor, an island in the Philippines
- Monaco-Ville, the old town of Monaco and one of its administrative divisions, known locally as Le Rocher (The Rock)
- Niue, an island in the South Pacific, near Tonga, commonly referred to as "The Rock (of Polynesia)"
- Roborough Rock, a rock outcrop near Dudley, England
- The Rock, Shropshire, an area of the town of Telford, Shropshire, England

== People ==
- Peter Hudson (darts player) (born 1984), English darts player
- Ole Anderson (1942-2024), American referee, promoter and retired wrestler
- Don Muraco (born 1949), American retired wrestler
- Warrior (wrestler) (1959-2014) American wrestler known as "Rock" while a member of The Blade Runners tag team with Sting
- Saint Peter (died between CE 64 and 68) Apostle of Jesus and 1st pope from 30 CE till 64-68 CE
- Pedro Rizzo (born 1974), Brazilian martial artist
- Michael Rock (swimmer), (born 1987), British swimmer
- Asi Taulava (born 1973), Filipino-Tongan basketball player
- Larry Zeidel (1928–2014), Canadian ice hockey player
- Ronny Rockel (born 1972), German bodybuilder

== Arts, entertainment, and media ==
=== Music ===
==== Albums ====
- The Rock (The Frankie Miller Band album), 1975
- The Rock (John Entwistle album), 1996
- The Rock (SBB album), 2007
- The Rock (Tracy Lawrence album), 2009

==== Songs ====
- "The Rock", by Atomic Rooster from In Hearing of Atomic Rooster
- "The Rock", by Delakota from One Love
- "The Rock", an instrumental by the Who from Quadrophenia
- "The Rock" (Forrest Frank and Crowder song)
- "The Rocks", by 5 Seconds of Summer from Everyone's a Star!

=== Other uses in music ===
- The Rock (Rachmaninoff), an orchestral composition
- The Rocks (band), former UK indie rock band
- The Rock, Indonesian rock band formed by Ahmad Dhani

=== Other uses in arts, entertainment, and media ===
- The Rock (play), by T. S. Eliot
- The Rock (radio station), a New Zealand rock music radio network
- "The Rock", episode of the sitcom The King of Queens

== Buildings ==
=== Athletic facilities ===
- The Rock, Rhosymedre, a football ground in Rhosymedre, Wales and home to Wrexham A.F.C Women and Cefn Druids A.F.C.
- Kidd Brewer Stadium, or "The Rock", at Appalachian State University
- Knute Rockne Memorial athletic facility, or "The Rock', on the University of Notre Dame
- Memorial Stadium (Indiana), or "The Rock", on the Indiana University campus
- Prudential Center, or "The Rock", in Newark, N.J.

=== Other buildings ===
- The Rock (building), a tower in Amsterdam
- "The Rock", Alcatraz Federal Penitentiary on island in San Francisco Bay
- "The Rock", or Rock N Roll McDonald's in Chicago
- "The Rock", Rockefeller Center in New York City
- The Rocks, Albany, residence in Albany, Western Australia

== Sports ==
- The Rock (rugby team) or Atlantic Rock, a rugby union team based in St. John's, Newfoundland & Labrador, Canada
- "The Rock," nickname of the athletic teams of Slippery Rock University
- The Rocks or Glasgow Rocks, a British basketball team
- Rockingham Speedway, a former NASCAR race track affectionately known as "The Rock"
- Toronto Rock, a Canadian indoor lacrosse team

== Other uses ==
- The Rock or Chicago, Rock Island and Pacific Railroad, a former Class I railroad in the US
- The Rocks, Inc., U.S. military officers' organization
- The Rock (diamond), largest white diamond ever auctioned as of 2022

== See also ==
- Rock (disambiguation)
