= La Roque =

La Roque or De la Roque may refer to:

== Places ==
- La Roque-Alric, a commune in the Vaucluse department in the Provence-Alpes-Côte d'Azur region in southeastern France
- La Roque-Baignard, a commune in the department of Calvados in the Basse-Normandie region in northern France
- La Roque-Esclapon, a commune in the Var department in the Provence-Alpes-Côte d'Azur region in southeastern France
- La Roque-Gageac, a commune in the Dordogne department in Aquitaine, south-western France
- La Roque-Sainte-Marguerite, a commune in the Aveyron department in southern France
- La Roque-sur-Cèze, a commune in the Gard department in southern France
- La Roque-sur-Pernes, a commune in the Vaucluse department in the Provence-Alpes-Côte d'Azur region in southeastern France
- Saint-Samson-de-la-Roque, a commune in the Eure department in Haute-Normandie in northern France

== Other uses ==
- La Roque (play), a play by American dramatist and playwright John Augustus Stone

== People with the surname ==
- Jean de la Roque (1661–1745), a French traveller and journalist
- François de La Rocque (6 October 1885 – 28 April 1946), French leader of Croix-de-feu

== See also ==
- Larroque (disambiguation)
- Roque (disambiguation)
- La Rocque, a commune in the department of Calvados in the Basse-Normandie region in northern France
