= San Roque Dam =

San Roque Dam may refer to:

- San Roque Dam (Philippines), a dam on the Agno River in Luzon, Philippines
- The dam of the artificial San Roque Lake in Córdoba, Argentina
