= Responsible Outgoing College Students =

Responsible Outgoing College Students (ROCS)
- Company type: Private company
- Industry: Recruitment
- Founded: 2003; 23 years ago
- Founder: Tommy Moore and Brandon Labman
- Headquarters: Reston, VA, United States
- Area served: Washington, D.C. metropolitan area
- Products: College student recruitment
- Services: Employment agency
- Website: www.rocsstaffing.com

ROCS (Responsible Outgoing College Students) is an American staffing agency that helps recruit top college students and recent graduates for companies in the Washington, D.C. metropolitan area.

== History ==
ROCS was founded in 2003 by two college students at George Mason University and grew fast, winning a Global Student Entrepreneur Award in 2005. By 2007 the company was fully launched. Within three years, the company's revenue climbed 900 percent — from $250,000 to more than $2.5 million in 2010.

ROCS primarily recruits from American University, Georgetown University, George Washington University, George Mason University, University of Maryland, and Virginia Tech. ROCS has over 200 clients, ranging from small non-profits to Fortune 500 companies, for which it does temporary staffing, temp-to-temp staffing, and direct-hire placement.

== Recognition ==
ROCS has been featured in dozens of publications such as The Washington Post, Harvard Business Review, Washington Business Journal, and Inc. Magazine. ROCS made Northern Virginia Magazine's list of top 10 companies with CEOs under 30.
