= Rock, West Virginia =

- Unincorporated community
- Location within the state of West Virginia Rock, West Virginia (the United States)
- Coordinates: 37°22′04″N 81°13′19″W
- Country: United States
- State: West Virginia
- County: Mercer
- Elevation: 2,178 ft (664 m)
- Time zone: UTC-5 (Eastern (EST))
  - Summer (DST): UTC-4 (EDT)
- ZIP code: 24747
- Area codes: 304 & 681
- GNIS feature ID: 1555496

Rock is an unincorporated community in Mercer County, West Virginia, United States. Rock is located along West Virginia Route 71, 2 miles (3.2 km) northeast of Montcalm. Rock has a post office with ZIP code 24747.

The community most likely took its name from a large rock formation near the original town site.
