= Rock Lake (Lyon County, Minnesota) =

Lake in the state of Minnesota, United States

- Location within Minnesota
- Location: Lyon County, Minnesota
- Coordinates: 44°16′34″N 95°56′8″W
- Type: lake

Rock Lake is a lake in Lyon County, in the U.S. state of Minnesota.

Rock Lake was named for the large boulders found in and around the lake.

== See also ==
- List of lakes in Minnesota
