= Rök =

Swedish parish

Coordinates: 58°17′38″N 14°47′11″E

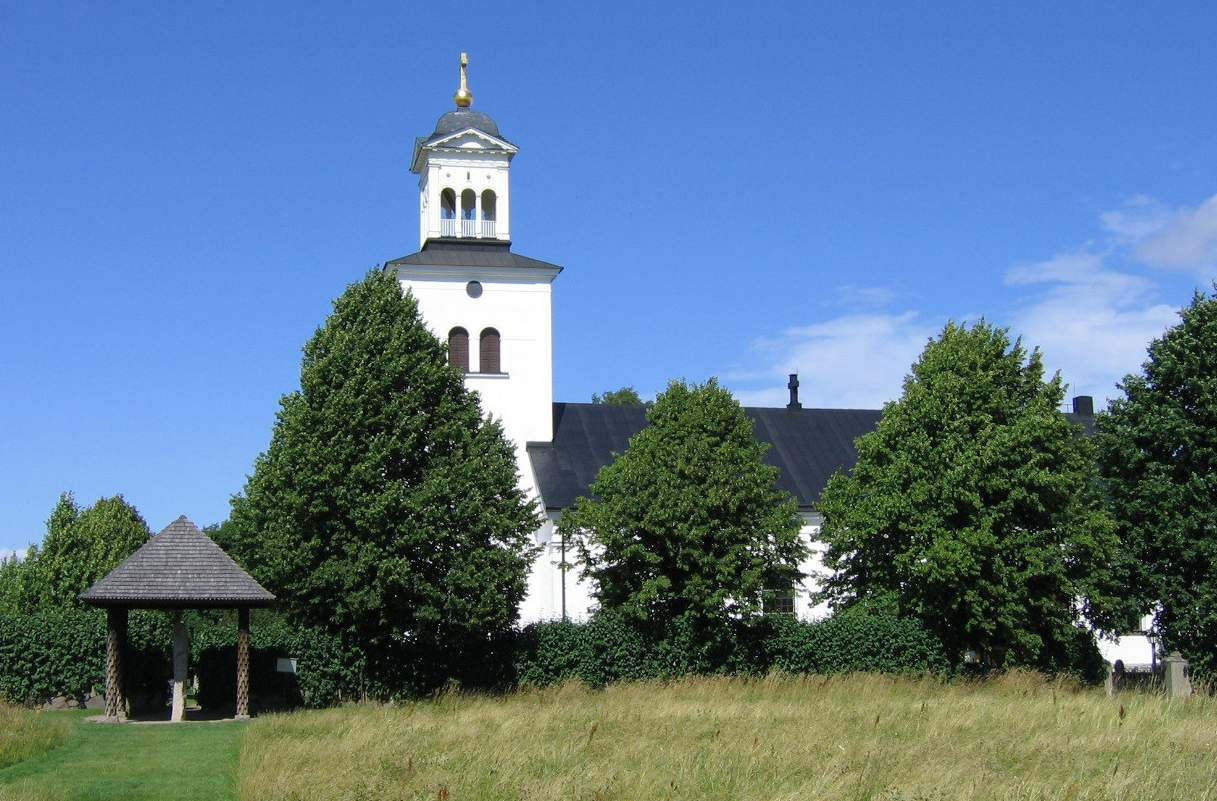
Church in Rök

Rök is a parish located in Östergötland, Sweden. It is mostly known for being the location where the Rök runestone is kept.
