= Rockey =

Given name and surname

Rockey is a given name and surname. Notable people with the name include:

== Given name ==
- Rockey Felker (born 1953), American footballer
- John Rockey Park (1833–1900), Utah educator
- Rockey Vaccarella, Hurricane Katrina survivor and activist

== Surname ==
- Clement Daniel Rockey (1889–1975), American bishop
- Dawn Rockey (born 1961), American politician from Nebraska
- Keller E. Rockey (1888–1970), United States Marine Corps general
- Sally Rockey (born 1958), American agriculture researcher

== See also ==
- Rock (disambiguation)
- Rocky (disambiguation)
- Rockies (disambiguation)
- Dr. A. E. and Phila Jane Rockey House, also known as Rockholm, in Portland, Oregon, US
- Rockey's Air Strip, an airport in Indiana, US
- Rockeye, an album by the British band The Outfield
- Mk-20 Rockeye II clusterbomb
