= Balboa =

Balboa may refer to:

== Boats ==
- Balboa 16, an American sailboat design
- Balboa 20, an American sailboat design
- Balboa 21, an American sailboat design
- Balboa 22, an American sailboat design
- Balboa 23, an American sailboat design
- Balboa 24, an American sailboat design

== Places ==
- Balboa, Cauca, a town and municipality in Colombia
- Balboa, León, a Spanish village and municipality
- Balboa, Panama, a port city in Panama
  - Balboa District of Panamá Province in Panama
- Balboa, Risaralda, a town and municipality in Colombia
- Balboa (Los Angeles Metro station), on the Los Angeles Metro Orange Line
- Balboa (lunar crater), located near the western limb of the Moon
- Balboa High School (California), an American public high school of San Francisco, California
- Balboa Island, Newport Beach, California, a harborside community in Newport Beach
- Balboa Park (disambiguation), any of several
- Balboa Peninsula, Newport Beach, California, a neighborhood of the city of Newport Beach
- Naval Medical Center San Diego, a US Navy medical treatment facility informally known as "Balboa Hospital"

== People ==
- Vasco Núñez de Balboa (c. 1475 – 1519), a Spanish explorer, governor, and conquistador
- Javier Balboa (born 1985), football midfielder
- Marcelo Balboa (born 1967), American former soccer defender
- Álex Balboa (born 2001), football midfielder

== Entertainment ==
- Balboa (dance), a close embrace style of swing dancing
- Balboa (band), a hardcore band from Philadelphia
- Balboa County, a fictional county setting for the Veronica Mars television series
- Rocky Balboa, protagonist of the Rocky film series
- Balboa, the merged tribe name in Survivor: Pearl Islands
- Balboa, a probe featured in Alien Planet
- Balboa Amusement Producing Company, a silent film era production company
- Balboa Productions, Sylvester Stallone's film production company

== Other uses ==
- Balboa (bug), a genus of dirt-colored seed bugs
- Balboa Line, a former train route in California, U.S.
- Panamanian balboa, the official currency of Panama

== See also ==
- Rocky Balboa (disambiguation)
