= Rocky (disambiguation) =

Rocky is a 1976 film starring Sylvester Stallone.

Rocky may also refer to:

== Arts and entertainment ==
=== Fictional characters ===
==== In film ====
- Rocky Balboa, in the Rocky Franchise
- Rocky Sullivan, in Angels with Dirty Faces
- Rocky and Mugsy, in various Looney Tunes and Merrie Melodies media
- Rocky the Rooster, in Chicken Run
- Rocky, in Don't Breathe
- Rocky, in The Rocky Horror Picture Show
- Rocky Gibraltar, a character in Toy Story
- Rocky, a gangster in Fat Pizza
- Rocky, in 3 Ninjas
- Rocky, in Aflatoon
- Rocky Randhawa, in Rocky Aur Rani Kii Prem Kahaani
- Raja Krishnappa Bairya "Rocky" in K.G.F Franchise
- Kabir Ahlawat "Rocky", in Rocky Handsome
- "Rocky" Hiranandani, in Deewane Huye Paagal
- Rocky the Eridian, in Project Hail Mary

==== In television ====
- Rocky DeSantos, in Mighty Morphin Power Rangers and Power Rangers: Zeo
- Rocky the Flying Squirrel, a character from The Rocky and Bullwinkle Show
- Rocky Robinson, a character in The Amazing World of Gumball
- Rocky, in the Canadian animated series Paw Patrol
- Joseph "Rocky" Rockford, in The Rockford Files
- Rocky Blue, a character in Shake It Up, played by Zendaya
- Rocky the Rescue Crane, a breakdown crane in Thomas & Friends

==== In other media ====
- Rocky Rodent, the titular rodent character in the 1993 video game Rocky Rodent
- Rocky, an anthropomorphic dog in the 1998 Swedish comic strip Rocky
- Rocky, a character from Battle for Dream Island, an animated web series
- Rocky Rickaby, the main feline protagonist in the 2006 webcomic Lackadaisy
- "Rocky" is the nickname given to an alien character in Andy Weir's 2021 novel Project Hail Mary, and
  - a 2026 film adaptation of the novel
- Rocky, a Simon Kidgits dog character developed by Simon Brand Ventures

=== Film and television ===
- Rocky (franchise), an American film franchise that debuted with the film Rocky in 1976
  - Rocky Balboa (film), the sixth film in the series from 2006
- Rocky (1948 film), an American film starring Roddy McDowall
- Rocky (1981 film), an Indian Bollywood film starring Sanjay Dutt
- Rocky (2006 Hindi film), an Indian Bollywood action film
- Rocky (2008 film), an Indian Kannada-language film
- Rocky (2013 film), an Indian Bengali-language film
- Rocky (2021 film), an Indian Tamil-language film
- "Rocky", a 2017 episode of The Keith & Paddy Picture Show

=== Gaming ===
- Rocky (1987 video game), for the Master System
- Rocky (2002 video game), for the GameCube, PlayStation 2, Xbox, and Game Boy Advance

=== Music ===
- Rocky (soundtrack), a soundtrack album from the 1976 film
- "Rocky" (song), a song from the Dickey Lee album Rocky (1975)
- "Rocky", a song from the Eric Burdon album Survivor (1977)
- "Rocky", a song from the Mike Oldfield album Light + Shade (2005)
- "Rocky", a song from The Lonely Island album Turtleneck & Chain (2011)
- "Rocky", a painted Fender Stratocaster guitar used by George Harrison; see List of guitars

== Mascots ==
- Rocky (bear), parachuting bear of the U.S. 187th Airborne Regimental Combat Team
- Rocky the Bull, mascot of the University of South Florida
- Rocky the Mountain Lion, mascot of the Denver Nuggets
- Rocky the Bulldog, mascot of the US Army 3rd Infantry Division
- Rocky the Lion, mascot for Slippery Rock University of Pennsylvania
- Rocky the Lion, mascot for Widener University
- Rocky the Red Hawk, mascot of Montclair State University
- Rocky the Rocket, mascot of the University of Toledo
- Rocky the Yellowjacket, mascot of the University of Rochester
- Rocky Raccoon, the mascot of the Minix OS

== People ==
- ASAP Rocky, American rapper
- Rocky (nickname)
- Rocky (singer), South Korean singer, rapper and former member of boy group Astro
- Rocky Dellesara, Canadian professional wrestler from NWA: All-Star Wrestling
- Rocky Elsom, Australian rugby player
- Rocky Fielding, British former professional boxer
- Rocky Gerung, Indonesian academic and political commentator
- Rocky Graziano, American boxing middleweight champion
- Rocky Johnson, Canadian professional wrestler
- Rocky Kramer, Norwegian rock guitarist and singer
- Rocky Maivia, a former ring name of Dwayne Johnson, American actor and professional wrestler
- Rocky Marciano, American boxing heavyweight champion
- Rocky Marshall, English actor
- Rocky Votolato, American musician

== Places ==
- Rocky, Oklahoma, a town
- Rocky Branch (New Hampshire), a river in the White Mountains of New Hampshire
- Rocky Harbour (Hong Kong)
- Rocky Harbour, Newfoundland and Labrador, Canada
- Rocky Mountains, a major mountain range in western North America
- Rocky Run (Bull Creek), a stream in Southwestern Pennsylvania
- A common nickname for Rockhampton, a city in Australia
- Rocky, Tuvalu, a former name of the island of Niulakita

== Other uses ==
- of or related to a rock
- Rocky the bear, a trained grizzly bear best known for appearing as Dewey the Killer Bear in 2008 film Semi-Pro
- Rocky Brands, American manufacturer of outdoor apparel and accessories
- Rocky Linux, a Linux distribution
- Daihatsu Rocky, Japanese automobile model

== See also ==
- Rocky Balboa (disambiguation)
- Daihatsu Rocky (disambiguation)
- Rockey (disambiguation)
- Rockies (disambiguation)
- Rock (disambiguation)
