= Vaccarella =

Vaccarella is a surname. In origin, it is a feminine form of the Italian word vaccaro ('cowherd'), thus meaning 'female cowherd'. Notable people with the surname include:

- Anna Vaccarella (born 1968), Venezuelan journalist
- Nino Vaccarella (1933–2021), Italian racing driver
- Rockey Vaccarella, American activist
