= Ernest G. Swigert House =

Historic building in Portland, Oregon, U.S.

- U.S. National Register of Historic Places
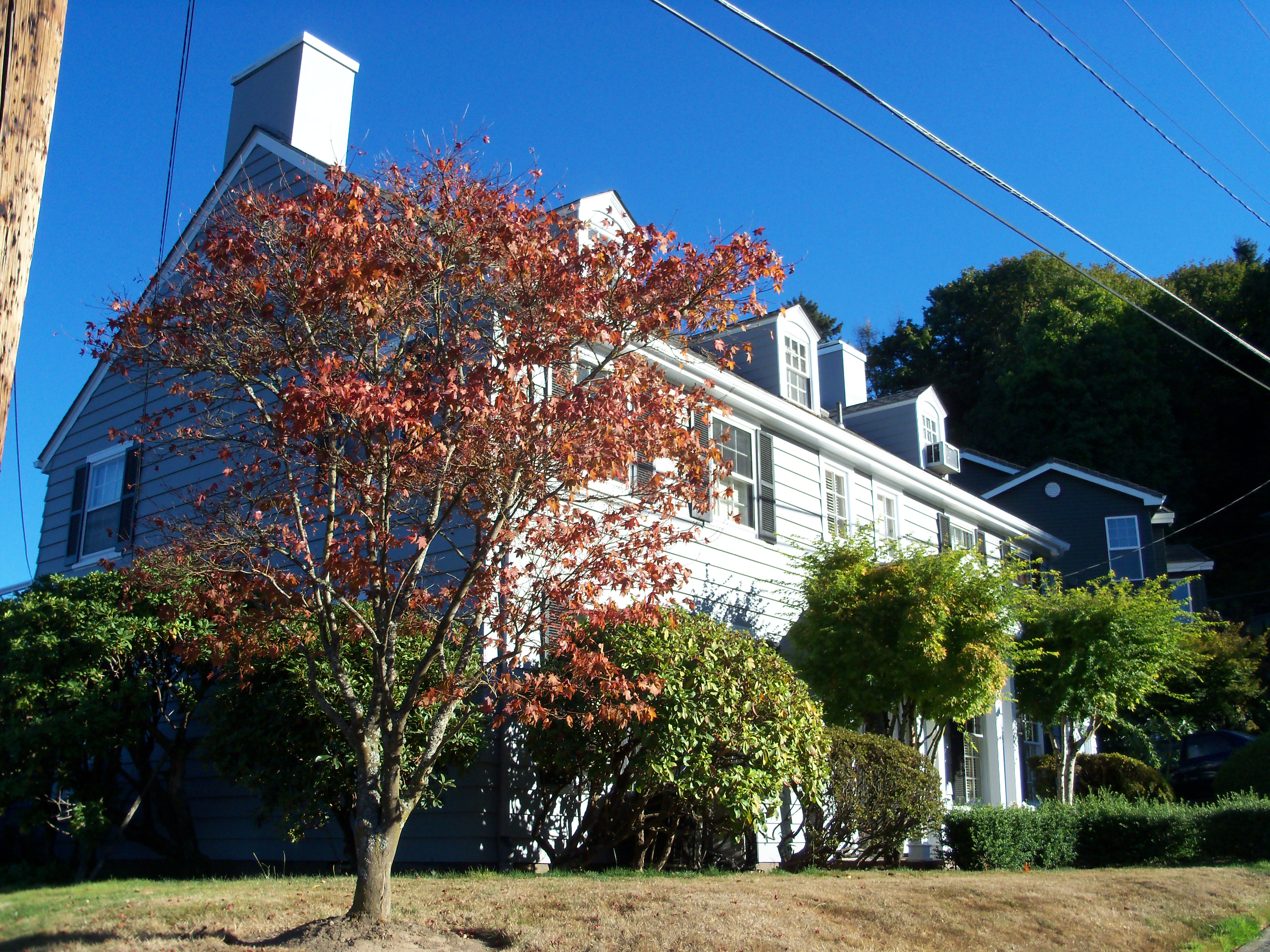

- Location within Oregon Location within the United States
- Location: 720 NW. Warrenton Terr., Portland, Oregon
- Coordinates: 45°31′42″N 122°42′44″W
- Area: 0.2 acres (0.081 ha)
- Built: 1934
- Architect: Folger Johnson
- Architectural style: Colonial Revival
- NRHP reference No.: 91000134
- Added to NRHP: February 28, 1991

The Ernest G. Swigert House is a house located in northwest Portland, Oregon listed on the National Register of Historic Places.

== See also ==
- National Register of Historic Places listings in Northwest Portland, Oregon
