= Rocky Balboa (disambiguation) =

Rocky Balboa is a fictional boxer, who is the main character in the Rocky film series.

Rocky Balboa may also refer to:

- Rocky Balboa (film series), series of American boxing sports-drama films
- Rocky Balboa (film), 2006 film and 6th entry in the film series
  - Rocky Balboa: The Best of Rocky (2006 album), compilation album of music from the film series
  - Rocky Balboa (video game), 2007 videogame based on the 2006 film

== See also ==
- Rocky (disambiguation)
- Balboa (disambiguation)
- Rocky Marciano (1923-1969) U.S. boxer, inspiration for the character's name and fighting style
- Chuck Wepner (born 1939) U.S. boxer, inspiration for the character and first film of the series
- Great White Hope (disambiguation)
