= Town Club (Portland, Oregon) =

Historic building in Portland, Oregon, U.S.

- U.S. National Register of Historic Places
- U.S. Historic district – Contributing property
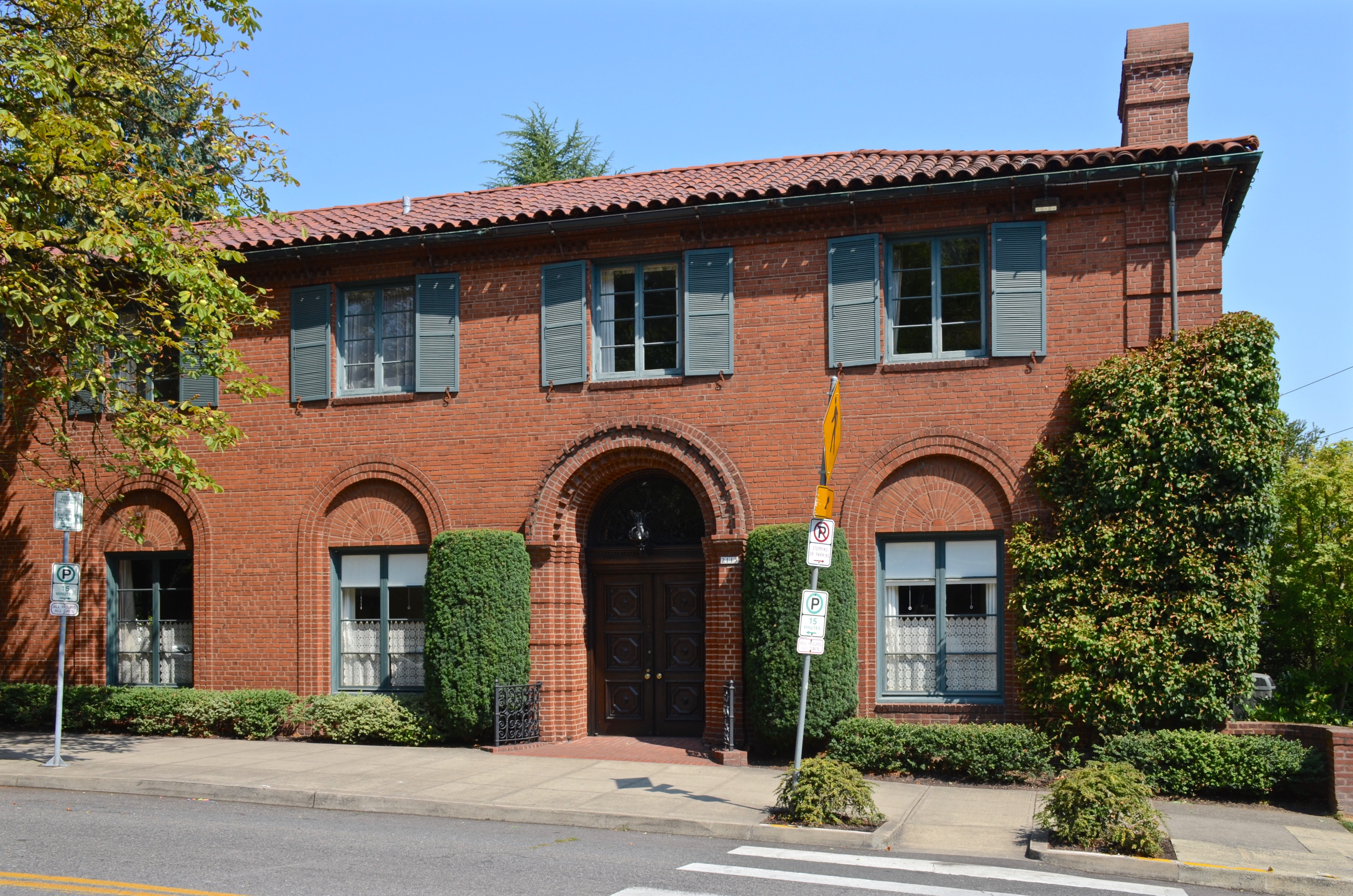
- South façade in 2015

- Location within Oregon
- Location: 2115 Southwest Salmon Street, Portland, Oregon
- Coordinates: 45.520911°N 122.694516°W
- Built: 1930; 96 years ago
- Built by: Johnson, Wallwork, & Johnston
- Architectural style: Mediterranean Revival
- Website: thetownclub.org
- Part of: King's Hill Historic District (ID91000039)
- NRHP reference No.: 87000328
- Added to NRHP: March 6, 1987

The Town Club is a women's club based in Portland, Oregon, United States.

== The Town Club ==
Founded in 1928, the club's original membership consisted of the wives of prominent Portland businessmen. The stated purpose of the club was to "promote and develop the physical and mental capacities of its members and to provide and maintain suitable opportunities, accommodations and facilities for social, recreational, educational, civic and charitable enterprises, movements and undertakings." In 1929, Mrs. T. B. Wilcox donated the property for the Town Club building. By 1930, membership had grown to 350. While membership is primarily for women, men are allowed to join the club. The club is still active.

== The building ==
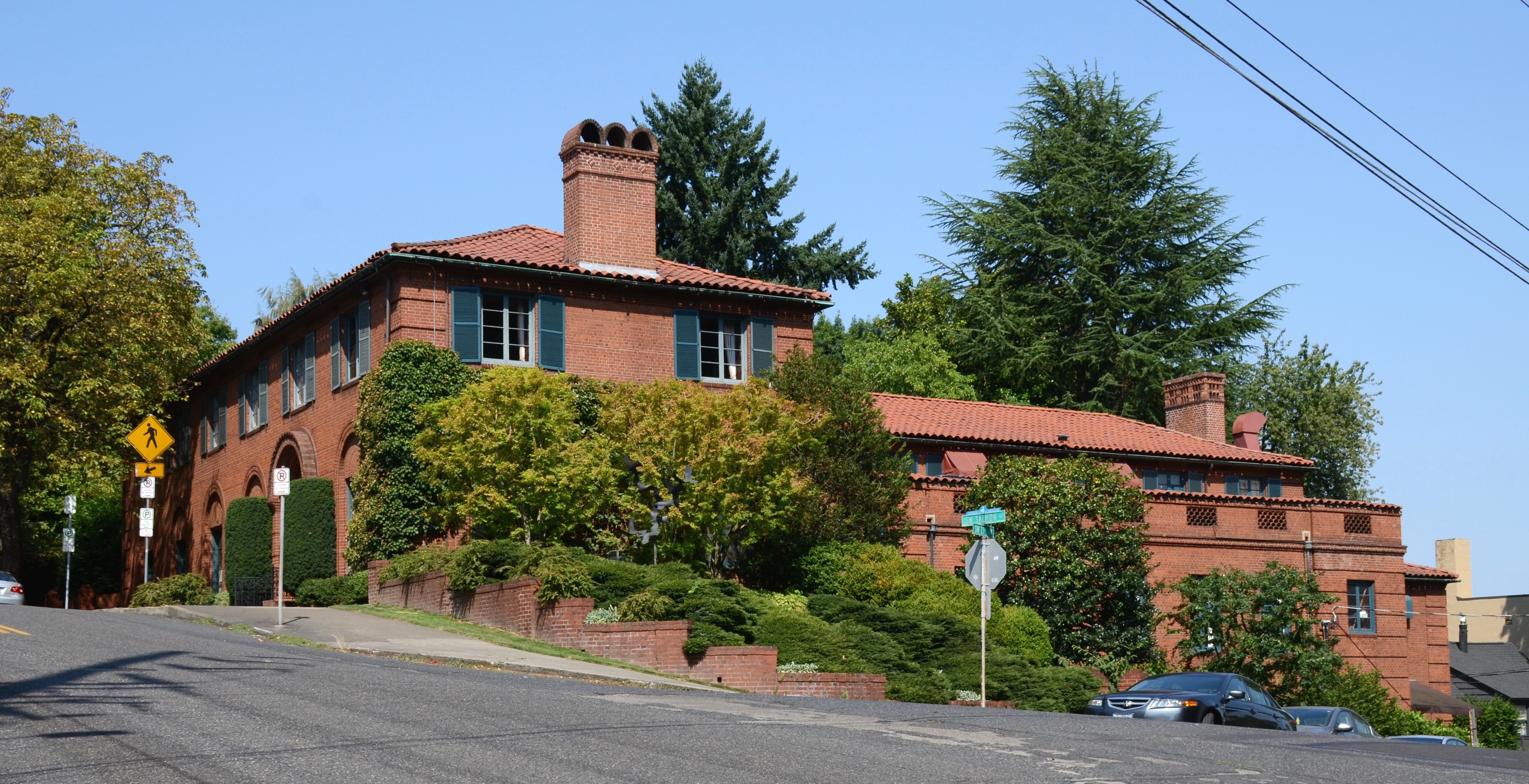
Viewed from the southeast in 2015

The Town Club's building was constructed in 1930 in the Mediterranean Revival style. It was designed by Johnson, Wallwork, & Johnston. Due to the steep incline of the property the club house was constructed with three "split" levels. It has a brick facade and a hipped tile roof. Originally, the building contained bedrooms to accommodate members returning to Portland to visit.

The Town Club building was listed on the National Register of Historic Places in 1987. The building is still standing and serves as a club house and event venue.
