= The Rockies (disambiguation) =

The Rockies, or Rocky Mountains, are a North American mountain range.

The Rockies may refer to:

- Canadian Rockies, a North American mountain range in Canada
- Colorado Rockies, a Colorado Major League baseball team
- Colorado Rockies (NHL), a former hockey team that became the New Jersey Devils
- Blackrock National Hurling Club, nicknamed The Rockies

== See also ==
- Rocky Mountain (disambiguation)
- Rock (disambiguation)
- Rocky (disambiguation)
- Rockey (disambiguation)
- Little Rocky Mountains in Montana
- North American Cordillera, the entire set of mountain ranges on the west coast of North America
- Rockies Express Pipeline, a natural gas pipeline
