= Galveston Airport =

- IATA: none; ICAO: none; FAA LID: 5I6

Summary
- Airport type: Public
- Owner: Galveston BOAC
- Serves: Galveston, Indiana
- Elevation AMSL: 786 ft (240 m)
- Coordinates: 40°35′03″N 086°15′25″W
- Interactive map of Galveston Airport

Runways
Direction	Length		Surface
Direction	ft	m	Surface
18/36	2,720	829	Turf
- Source: Federal Aviation Administration

Galveston Airport (FAA LID: 5I6) is a public-use airport in unincorporated Cass County, Indiana, United States. The airport is located three nautical miles (6 km) northwest of the central business district of Galveston, Indiana.

== Facilities ==
Galveston Airport covers an area of 272 acres (110 ha) at an elevation of 786 feet (240 m) above mean sea level. It has one runway designated 18/36 with a turf surface measuring 2,720 by 75 feet (829 x 23 m).

== See also ==
- List of airports in Indiana
