= Galveston, Indiana =

- Town
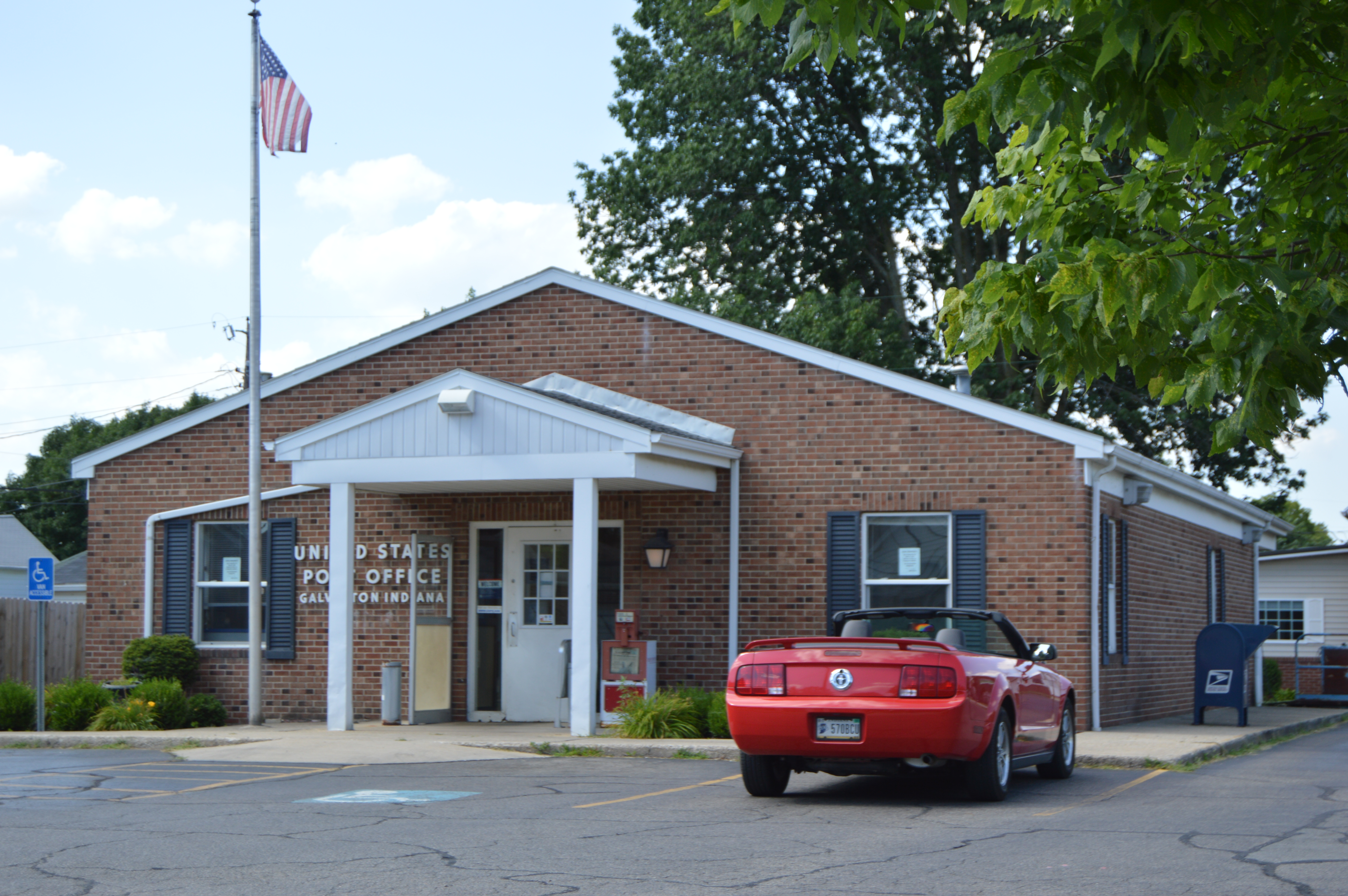
- Post office

- Logo

- Location of Galveston in Cass County
- Coordinates: 40°34′36″N 86°11′32″W
- Country: United States
- State: Indiana
- County: Cass
- Township: Jackson
- Established: 1852 (laid out); 1870 (incorporated)

Area
  - Total: 0.58 sq mi (1.49 km^{2})
  - Land: 0.58 sq mi (1.49 km^{2})
  - Water: 0 sq mi (0.00 km^{2})
- Elevation: 807 ft (246 m)

Population (2020)
  - Total: 1,288
  - Density: 2,239.7/sq mi (864.77/km^{2})
- Time zone: UTC-5 (EST)
  - Summer (DST): UTC-4 (EDT)
- ZIP code: 46932
- Area code: 574
- FIPS code: 18-26242
- GNIS feature ID: 2396954
- Website: www.in.gov/towns/galveston/

Galveston (/ɡælˈvɛstən/ gal-VESS-tən) is a town in Jackson Township, Cass County, Indiana, approximately 7 miles northwest of downtown Kokomo. As of the 2020 census, Galveston had a population of 1,288.

== History ==
Galveston was laid out in 1854. It was probably named after Galveston, Texas, although folk etymology holds that "a gal with a vest on" caused the name to be selected. Galveston was incorporated as a town in 1870.

== Geography ==
According to the 2010 census, Galveston has a total area of 0.52486 square miles (1.36 km^{2}), all land.

== Demographics ==
Historical population
Census	Pop.	Note	%±
1870	390		—
1880	415		6.4%
1910	658		—
1920	691		5.0%
1930	606		−12.3%
1940	735		21.3%
1950	905		23.1%
1960	1,111		22.8%
1970	1,284		15.6%
1980	1,822		41.9%
1990	1,609		−11.7%
2000	1,532		−4.8%
2010	1,311		−14.4%
2020	1,288		−1.8%
US Decennial Census

=== 2020 census ===
As of the 2020 census, Galveston had a population of 1,288. The median age was 43.1 years. 22.0% of residents were under the age of 18 and 20.7% of residents were 65 years of age or older. For every 100 females there were 94.3 males, and for every 100 females age 18 and over there were 87.7 males age 18 and over.

0.0% of residents lived in urban areas, while 100.0% lived in rural areas.

There were 576 households in Galveston, of which 25.5% had children under the age of 18 living in them. Of all households, 43.1% were married-couple households, 18.4% were households with a male householder and no spouse or partner present, and 30.0% were households with a female householder and no spouse or partner present. About 31.1% of all households were made up of individuals and 13.9% had someone living alone who was 65 years of age or older.

There were 634 housing units, of which 9.1% were vacant. The homeowner vacancy rate was 2.0% and the rental vacancy rate was 10.4%.

Racial composition as of the 2020 census
Race	Number	Percent
White	1,196	92.9%
Black or African American	7	0.5%
American Indian and Alaska Native	4	0.3%
Asian	8	0.6%
Native Hawaiian and Other Pacific Islander	0	0.0%
Some other race	17	1.3%
Two or more races	56	4.3%
Hispanic or Latino (of any race)	44	3.4%

=== 2010 census ===
As of the 2010 United States census, there were 1,311 people, 553 households, and 368 families in the town. The population density was 2,473.6 inhabitants per square mile (955.1/km^{2}). There were 633 housing units at an average density of 1,194.3 per square mile (461.1/km^{2}). The racial makeup of the town was 96.9% White, 0.5% African American, 0.3% Native American, 0.5% Asian, 0.4% from other races, and 1.4% from two or more races. Hispanic or Latino of any race were 1.6% of the population.

There were 553 households, of which 32.9% had children under the age of 18 living with them, 49.4% were married couples living together, 13.2% had a female householder with no husband present, 4.0% had a male householder with no wife present, and 33.5% were non-families. 29.3% of all households were made up of individuals, and 10.5% had someone living alone who was 65 years of age or older. The average household size was 2.37 and the average family size was 2.92.

The median age in the town was 39.6 years. 24.9% of residents were under the age of 18; 7% were between the ages of 18 and 24; 26.4% were from 25 to 44; 27.8% were from 45 to 64; and 13.9% were 65 years of age or older. The gender makeup of the town was 48.5% male and 51.5% female.

=== 2000 census ===
As of the 2000 United States census, there were 1,532 people, 615 households, and 448 families living in the town. The population density was 2,702.9 inhabitants per square mile (1,043.6/km^{2}). There were 649 housing units at an average density of 1,145.0 per square mile (442.1/km^{2}). The racial makeup of the town was 97.98% White, 0.33% African American, 0.46% Native American, 0.33% Asian, and 0.91% from two or more races. Hispanic or Latino of any race were 1.37% of the population.

There were 615 households, out of which 34.6% had children under the age of 18 living with them, 58.5% were married couples living together, 10.4% had a female householder with no husband present, and 27.0% were non-families. 23.7% of all households were made up of individuals, and 7.3% had someone living alone who was 65 years of age or older. The average household size was 2.49 and the average family size was 2.95.

The town population contained 25.8% under the age of 18, 9.9% from 18 to 24, 28.4% from 25 to 44, 24.8% from 45 to 64, and 11.0% who were 65 years of age or older. The median age was 35 years. For every 100 females there were 92.5 males. For every 100 females age 18 and over, there were 90.6 males.

The median income for a household in the town was $45,450, and the median income for a family was $48,942. Males had a median income of $35,000 versus $24,250 for females. The per capita income for the town was $22,880. About 3.4% of families and 4.4% of the population were below the poverty line, including 4.6% of those under age 18 and 8.8% of those age 65 or over.

== Transportation ==
Two airports are near Galveston in unincorporated Cass County:

- Galveston Airport, publicly owned, is open for public use;
- Rockey's Air Strip is a privately owned airport for private use.

== Education ==
Galveston has a public library, a branch of the Cass County Public Library.

Formerly known as Galveston Elementary School, Galveston has a polytechnic academy, known as Lewis Cass Polytechnic Academy.
