= Folger Johnson =

American architect

- Born: July 4, 1888; Columbus, Georgia, U.S.
- Died: November 4, 1970 (aged 82); Portland, Oregon
- Occupation: Architect

Folger Johnson (July 4, 1882 – November 4, 1970) was an architect who practiced in Portland, Oregon. Several of his works are listed on the U.S. National Register of Historic Places for their architecture.

Johnson was born on July 4, 1882, in Columbus, Georgia. He graduated from the Technical Institute of Georgia and from Columbia University. He studied at the Ecole des Beaux-Arts in Paris from 1908 to 1910. He worked for an architect in New York City, then came to Portland (in 1911) and worked with architect MacDonald F. Mayer. He then practiced individually and later in partnerships with Jamieson Parker and with Carl H. Wallwork. Partnerships in which he worked include Johnson & Mayer (1911–1916), Johnson, Parker and Wallwork (1920–1927), Johnson & Wallwork (1930–1935), Johnson, Wallwork and Dukehart (1935–1946) and Johnson, Wallwork and Hollis Johnston (1930).

He served on the staff of the Public Works Administration in Oregon from 1933 to 1938, and later he served as state director of the Federal Housing Administration from 1940 to his retirement in 1950. He also served on the Portland Planning Commission and as a member of the Portland Art Commission.

Johnson was married to Edith Waldo and later was married to Shelby Payne. He died in a Portland hospital on November 4, 1970.

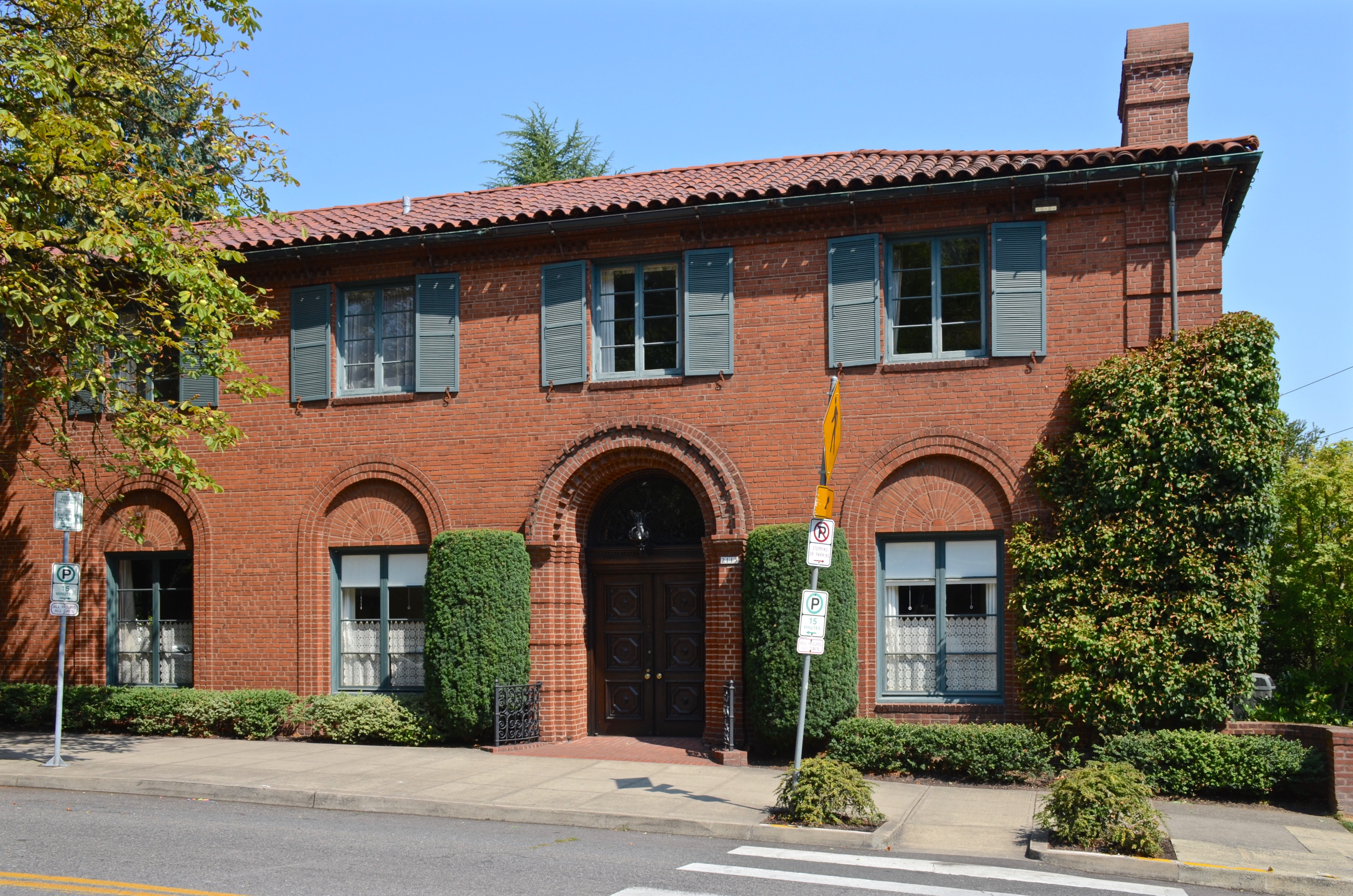
The Town Club's clubhouse

Works include:

- Dr. A. E. and Phila Jane Rockey House (1913), AKA Rockholm, in the outskirts of Portland, Oregon, NRHP-listed.
- Ernest G. Swigert House (1934), at 720 N.W. Warrenton Terrace in Portland, NRHP-listed
- Umatilla County Library in Pendleton, Oregon, NRHP-listed
- Albertina Kerr Nursery (1921) as part of Johnson, Parker and Wallwork, NRHP-listed
- The Town Club clubhouse (1930), as part of Johnson, Wallwork and Hollis Johnston, NRHP-listed
- Gresham Carnegie Library built in 1913 in Gresham, Oregon was his design.
