= Daihatsu Rocky (A200) =

Subcompact crossover SUV

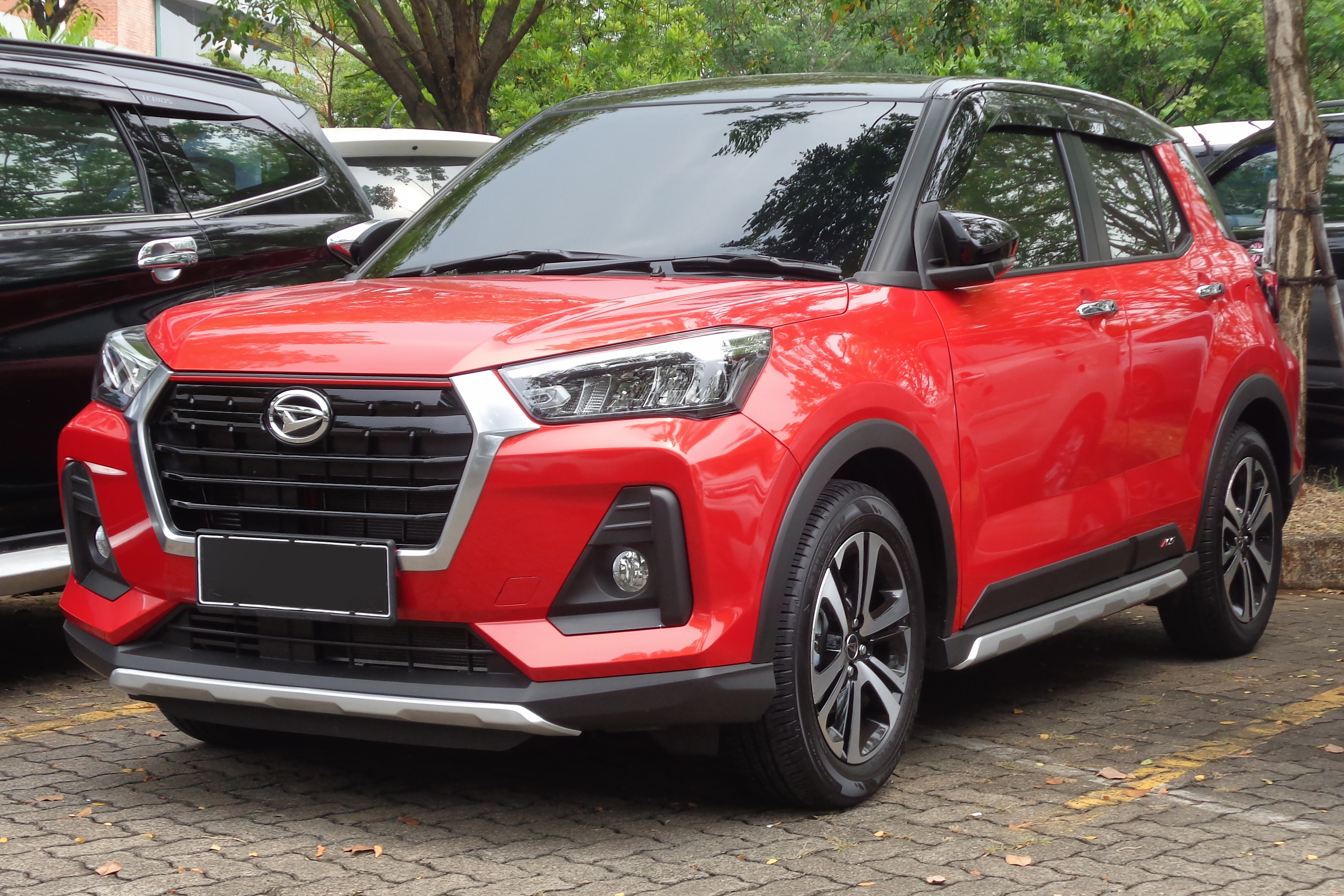
- 2021 Rocky 1.0 R TC ADS Package (A250RS, Indonesia)

Overview
- Manufacturer: Daihatsu
- Model code: A200 (Japan); A210 (Japan, all-wheel drive); A250 (Indonesian production); A270 (Perodua Ativa)
- Also called: Toyota Raize; Perodua Ativa (Malaysia, 2021–present); Subaru Rex (Japan, 2022–present)
- Production: October 2019 – present
- Assembly: Japan: Ryūō, Shiga (Ryūō plant, Rocky/Raize/Rex); Indonesia: Karawang, West Java (ADM, Rocky/Raize); Malaysia: Rawang, Selangor (PMSB, Ativa)
- Designer: List: Jiro Matsueda, Satoshi Isayama, Yoshihisa Okuno and Shinji Tamura; Ayumi Kadota and Kenji Aoki (interior)

Body and chassis
- Class: Subcompact crossover SUV
- Body style: 5-door SUV
- Layout: Front-engine, front-wheel-drive; Front-engine, four-wheel-drive (Japan only)
- Platform: Daihatsu New Global Architecture: DNGA-A
- Related: Daihatsu Ayla (A350); Perodua Axia (A300)

Powertrain
- Engine: Petrol: 996 cc 1KR-VET turbo I3; 1198 cc WA-VE I3; Petrol hybrid: 1198 cc WA-VEX I3
- Electric motor: E1A AC synchronous (hybrid models)
- Transmission: 5-speed manual; 4-speed D-CVT
- Hybrid drivetrain: Series
- Battery: 4.3 Ah lithium-ion (hybrid models)

Dimensions
- Wheelbase: 2,525 mm (99.4 in)
- Length: 3,995 mm (157.3 in) (Japan); 4,030 mm (158.7 in) (International); 4,065 mm (160.0 in) (Malaysia)
- Width: 1,695 mm (66.7 in) (Japan); 1,710 mm (67.3 in) (International)
- Height: 1,605 mm (63.2 in) (international); 1,620 mm (63.8 in) (Japan); 1,635 mm (64.4 in) (Indonesia/Malaysia)
- Kerb weight: 970–1,035 kg (2,138–2,282 lb) (FWD); 1,040–1,050 kg (2,293–2,315 lb) (4WD); 1,060–1,070 kg (2,337–2,359 lb) (hybrid models)

Chronology
- Predecessor: Daihatsu Be‣go (Rocky); Toyota Rush (J200) (Raize); Perodua Nautica (Ativa)

The A200/A250 series Daihatsu Rocky (Japanese: ダイハツ・ロッキー, Hepburn: Daihatsu Rokkī) is a subcompact crossover SUV manufactured by Daihatsu. It was unveiled at the 46th Tokyo Motor Show on 23 October 2019 under the "New Compact SUV" name. It replaced the Be‣go in the Japanese market and went on sale on 5 November 2019. The Rocky is also rebadged and sold under Toyota and Subaru brands as the Toyota Raize (Japanese: トヨタ・ライズ, Hepburn: Toyota Raizu) and Subaru Rex (Japanese: スバル・レックス, Hepburn: Subaru Rekkusu) respectively.

Outside of Japan, the model is also manufactured in Indonesia and Malaysia. The Indonesian model of Rocky and Raize have been sold locally since April 2021 and also exported as the Raize to 50 countries. The Malaysian model is sold under the Perodua brand as the Perodua Ativa since February 2021.

== Overview ==
Development of the vehicle started around 2017, headed by Daihatsu chief engineer Nobuhiko Ono. Suggestions for making a larger vehicle were turned down by Ono, citing their expertise in developing kei cars. It is built on Daihatsu's DNGA platform and internally grouped as an A-segment vehicle, positioned below the Yaris Cross.

Rocky's design was previewed by the 2017 DN Trec concept. The Rocky nameplate was previously used for two different (F300 and F70 series) ladder frame-based SUV models and was reused after a 17-year hiatus. The A200 series Rocky is only available in Japan, with models produced in Indonesia designated as A250 series. With its width under 1.7 metres (66.9 in), the Japanese-spec Rocky is compliant with the Japanese government's dimension regulations regarding compact cars which reduce tax liability.

The A250 model is identified by the more pronounced rear bumper, a metal tailgate instead of plastic and slightly wider body than the A200 model. These modifications are also present on the Malaysian market Perodua Ativa.

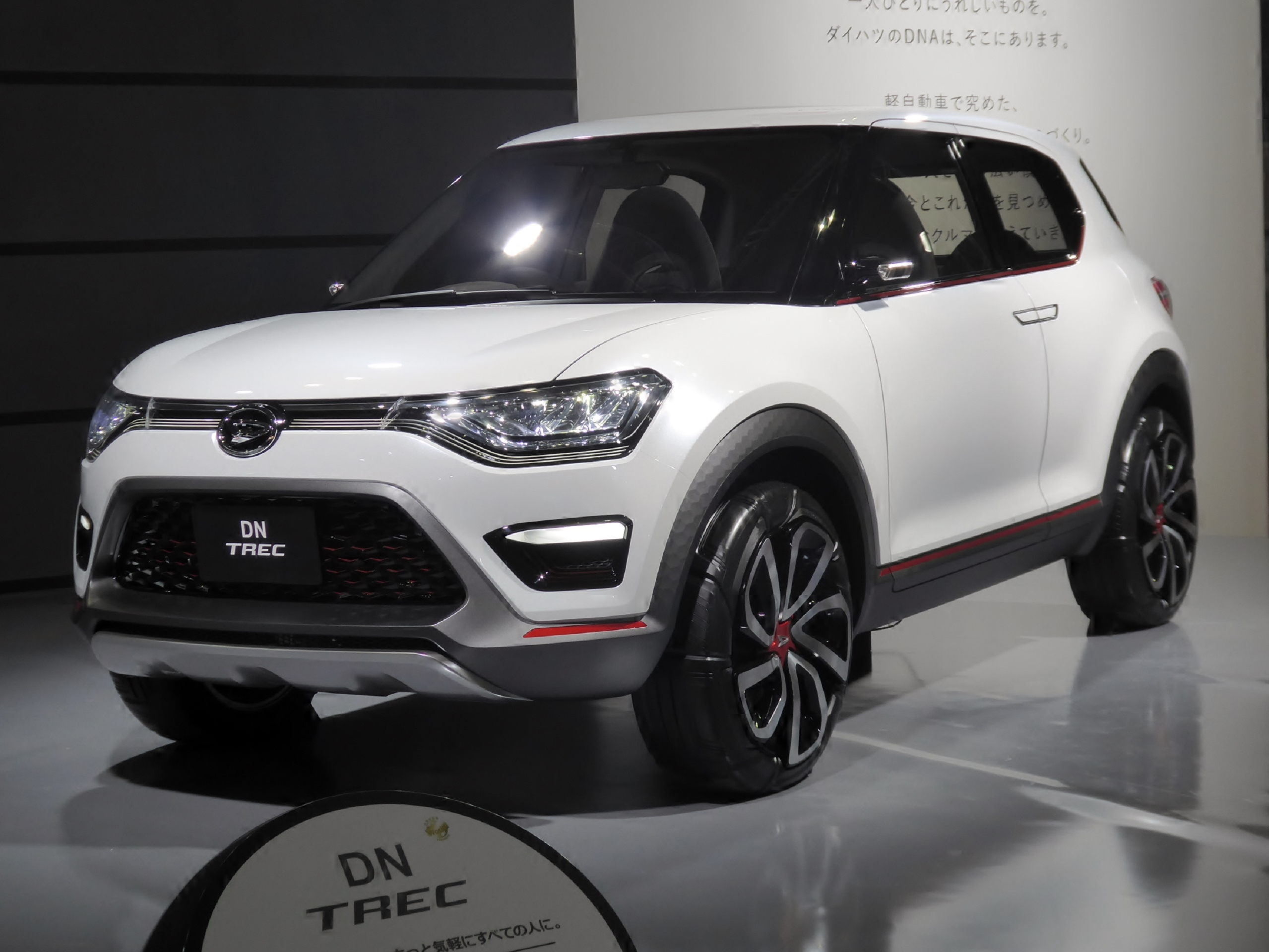
DN Trec concept car

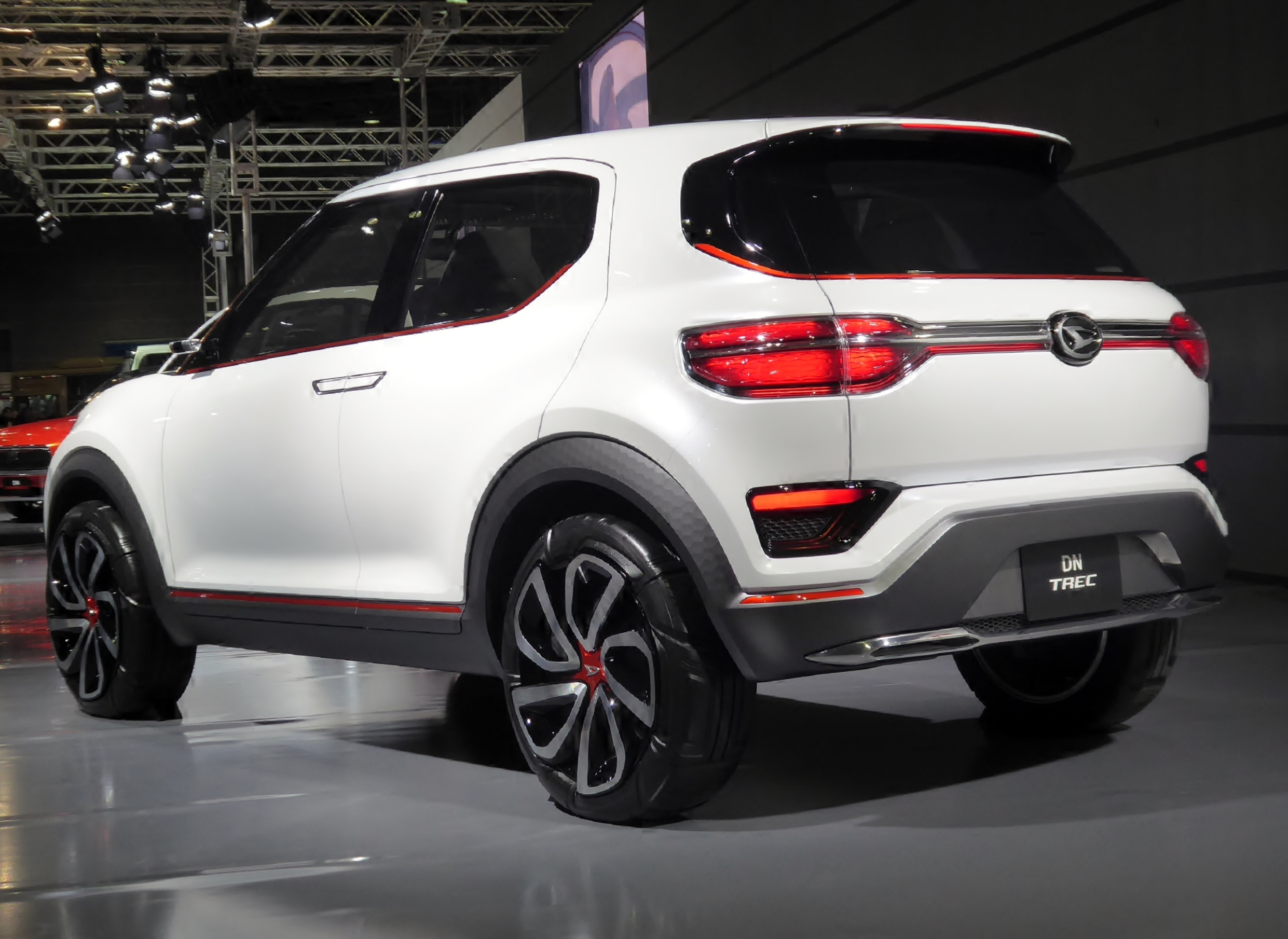
DN Trec concept car

=== Markets ===
==== Japan ====
Initially, the Rocky was offered in L, X, G and Premium grade levels in Japan, which were all powered by a 1KR-VET engine with four-wheel drive option available for every grade. In November 2021, the G grade was removed and the Premium grade was replaced by Premium G. The 1KR-VET engine option for front-wheel drive models was also replaced by the WA-VE unit used earlier in the Indonesian market Rocky.

The hybrid-electric variant, which is introduced in the same month, is available in X and Premium G grades. Four-wheel drive option is not offered for this variant. The exterior received minor makeover with a mesh grille, different alloy wheels with 5 lugs, blue accent on Daihatsu's badges and "e-Smart Hybrid" badge on the tailgate to distinguish it from the conventional petrol models.

Both Rocky and Raize received a minor update on 16 November 2026. Change includes a black hood garnish and various gunmetal skid plates, and new 7-inch TFT color LCD display.

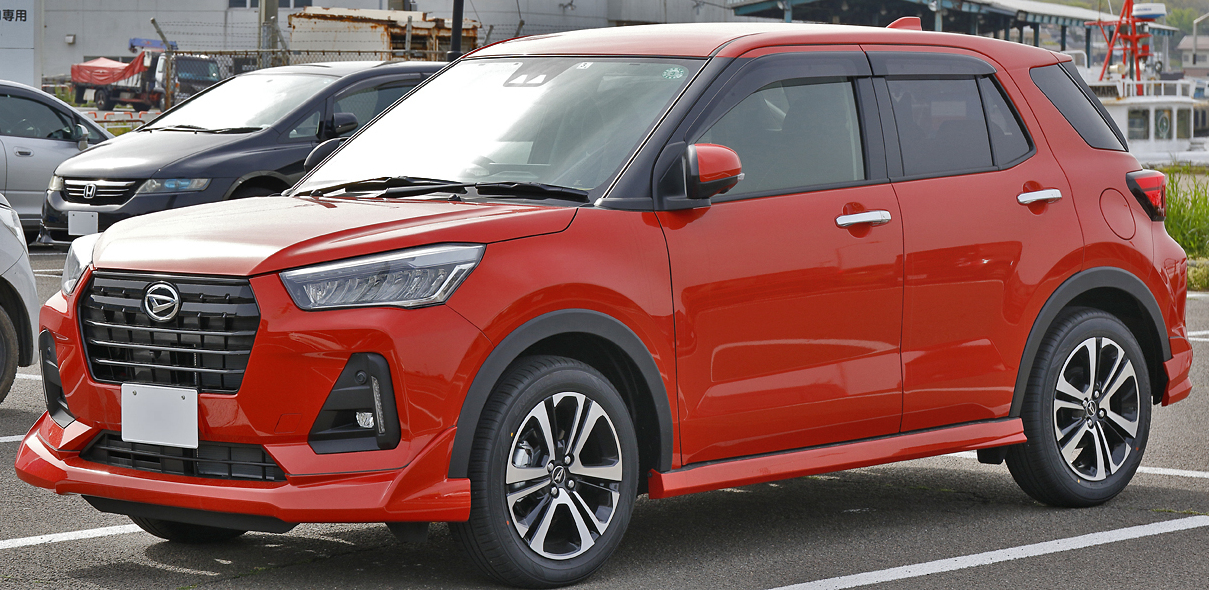
Rocky G with optional aerokits (A200S, Japan)

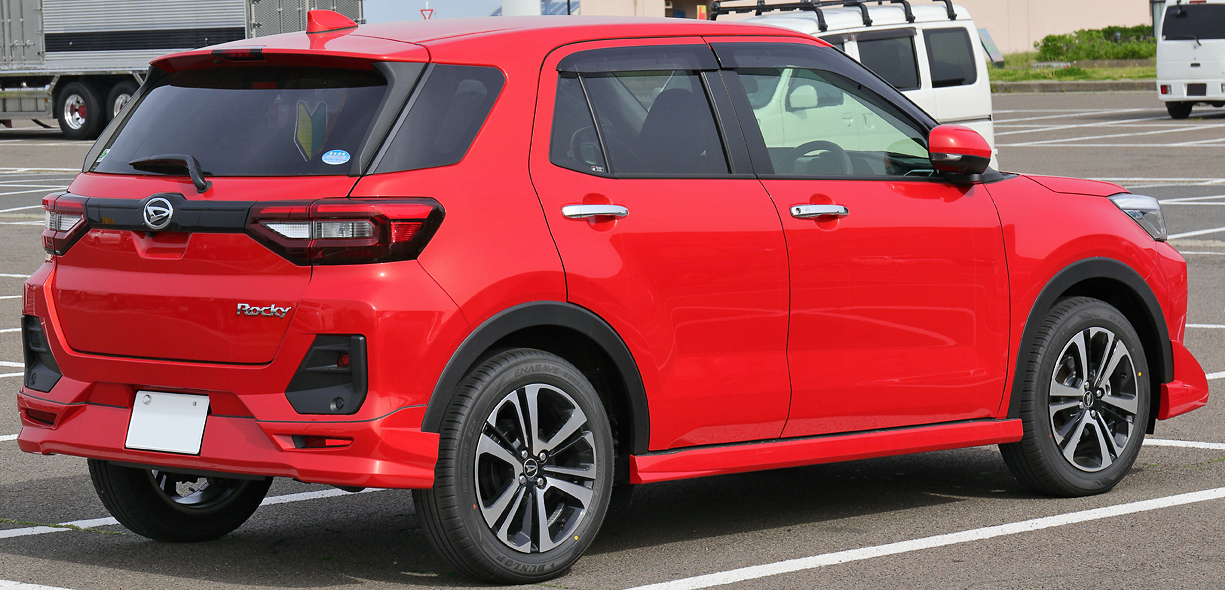
Rocky G with optional aerokits (A200S, Japan)

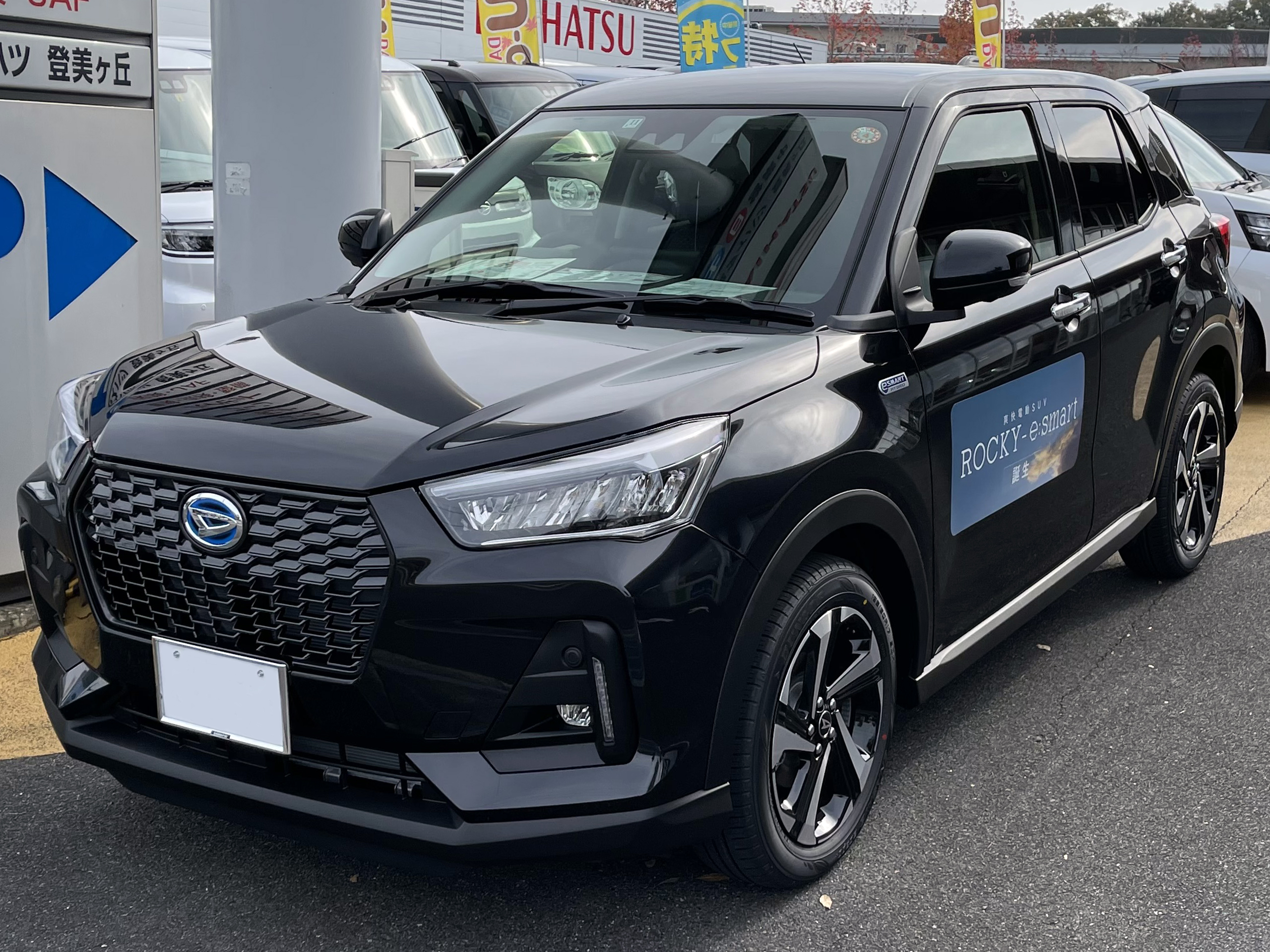
2021 Rocky Premium G HEV (A202S, Japan)

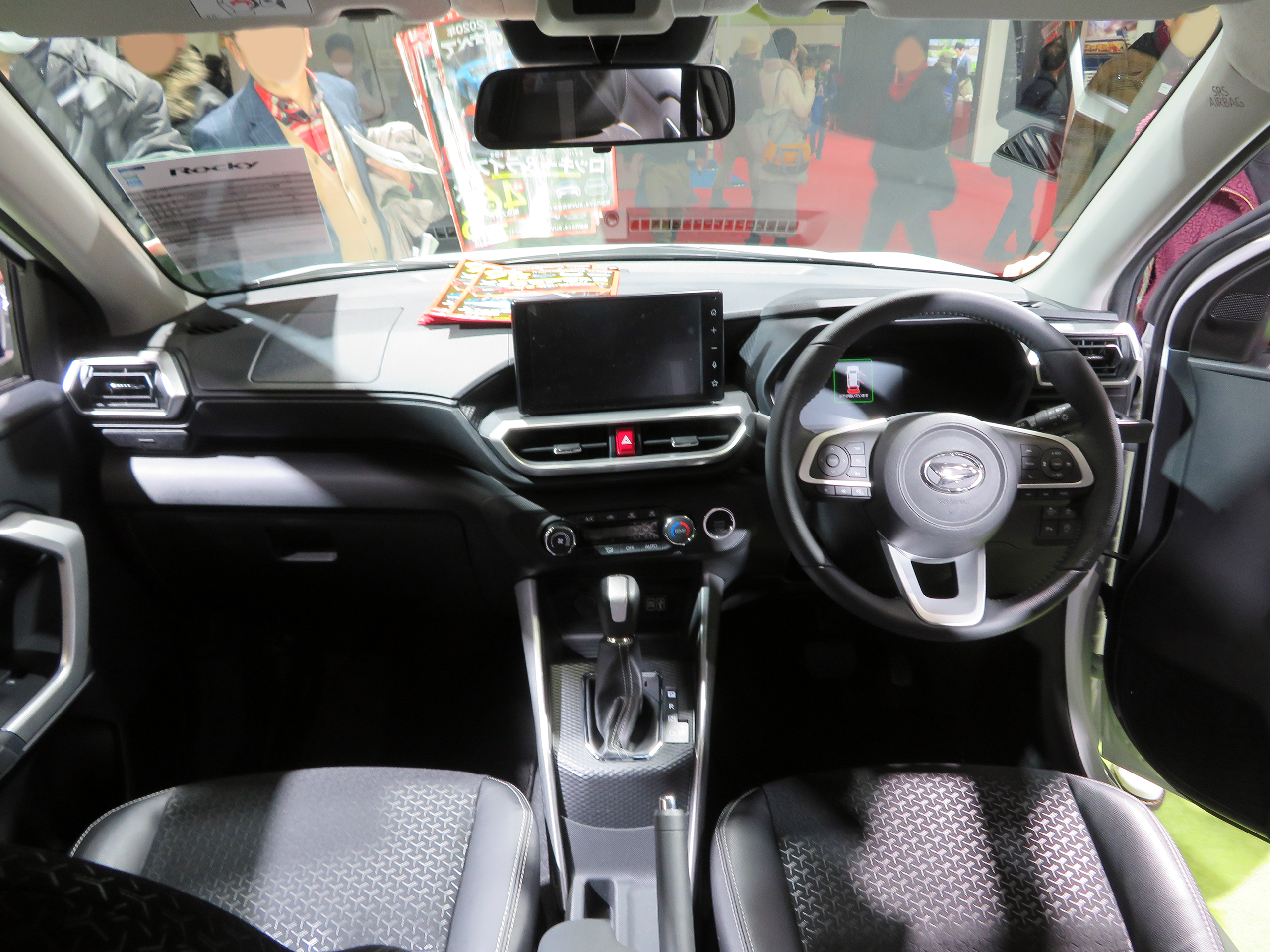
2019 Rocky Premium interior (Japan)

==== Indonesia ====
The Rocky was unveiled in Indonesia alongside the Raize on 28 April 2021 and went on sale on 30 April 2021. Daihatsu invested Rp 1.7 trillion for the production tooling for their Karawang assembly plant, achieving around 70 percent of locally produced parts. In Indonesia, the Rocky is offered in the M, X and R grade levels with either a manual transmission or CVT. The M and X grades are powered by the WA-VE engine, while the R grade is powered by the 1KR-VET unit. Astra Daihatsu Styling (ADS) package and Advanced Safety Assist (ASA) driver-assistance system are also available as an option. The 1.2-litre model has been available since June 2021.

The e-Smart Hybrid variant, imported from Japan, was made available in July 2025. It is only offered in the X grade level. Minor facelift was released in September 2025 with a new mesh grille, full black interior and refreshed ADS package.

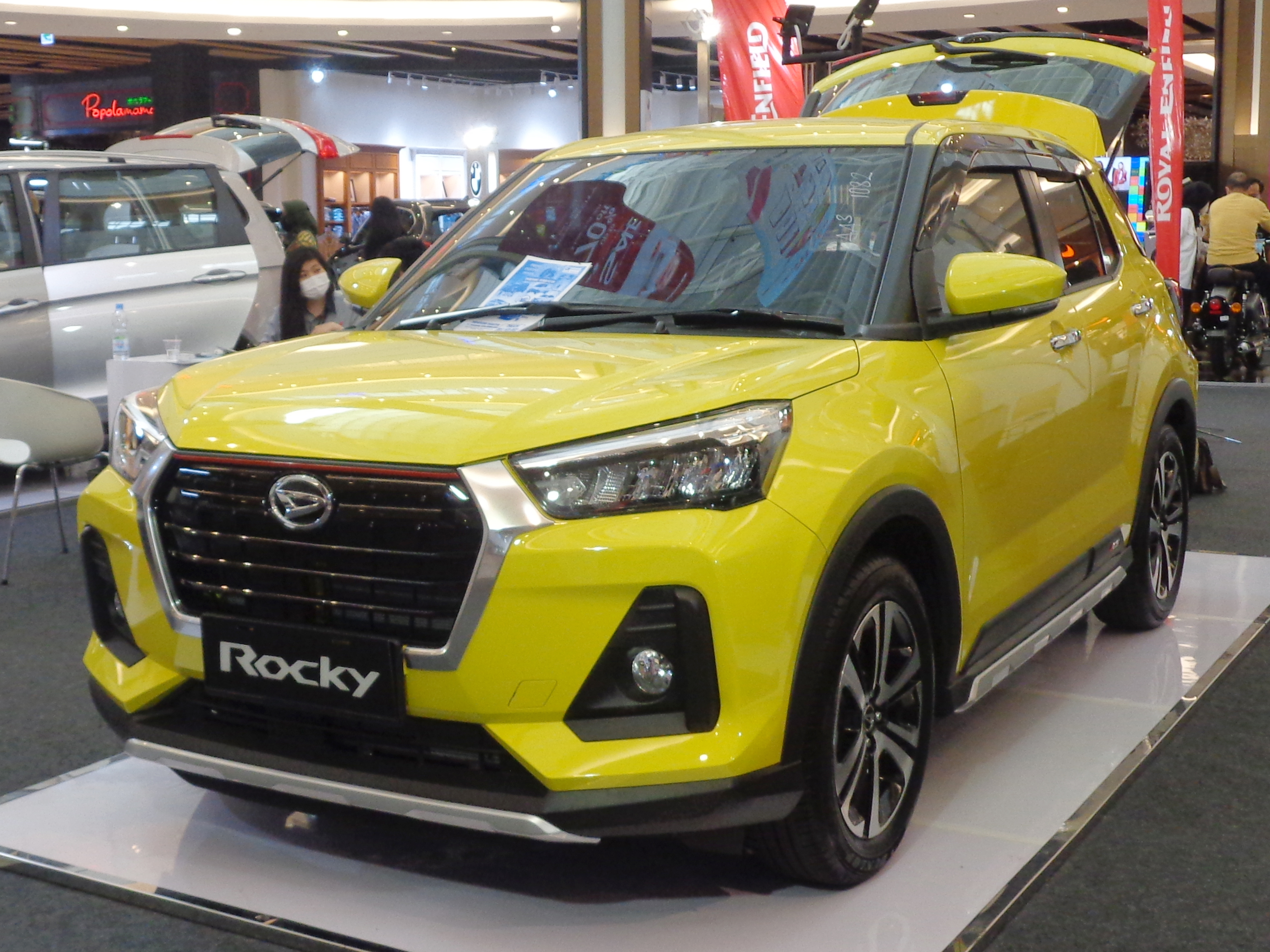
2021 Rocky 1.2 TC R ADS Package (A250RS, Indonesia)

== Toyota Raize ==
The Toyota-badged model is sold and marketed as the Toyota Raize in Japan and most international markets. It is mostly identical with the Rocky, differentiated by its front fascia which adopted Toyota's corporate look. The international (A250) model, mainly sold for emerging markets, is manufactured in Indonesia by Astra Daihatsu Motor.

The name Raize is derived from a combination of the words rise and raise, which according to Toyota, signifies an "active car that energises everyday life".

=== Markets ===
==== Japan ====
In Japan, the Raize replaces the J200 series Rush. It is offered in X, X"S", G and Z grade levels, with each grade has a four-wheel drive option. In November 2021, similar to the Rocky, the 1KR-VET engine option for regular front-wheel drive models was replaced by the WA-VE unit. The hybrid-electric variant was also introduced for G and Z grades as well.

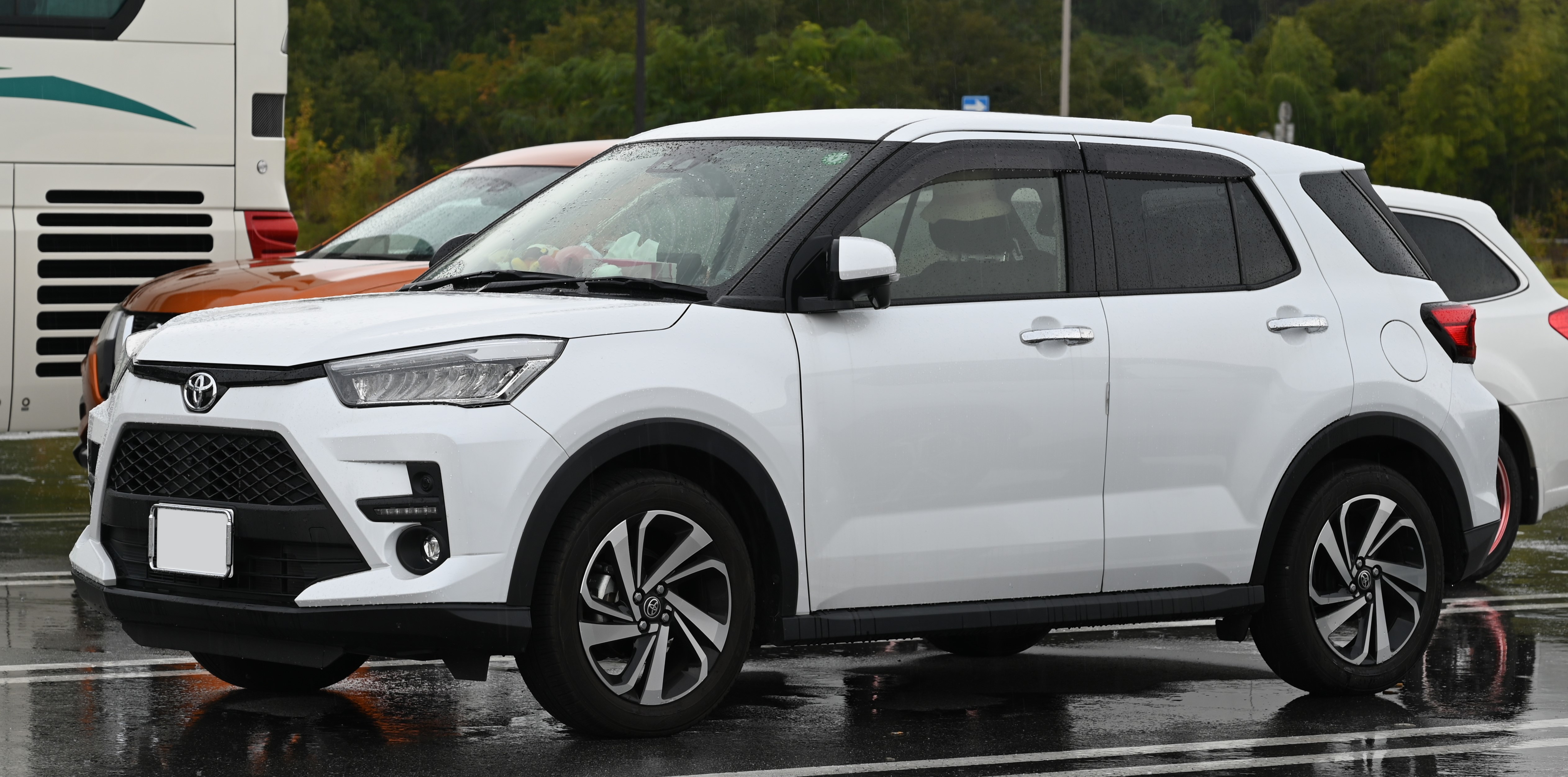
Toyota Raize Z (A210A, Japan)

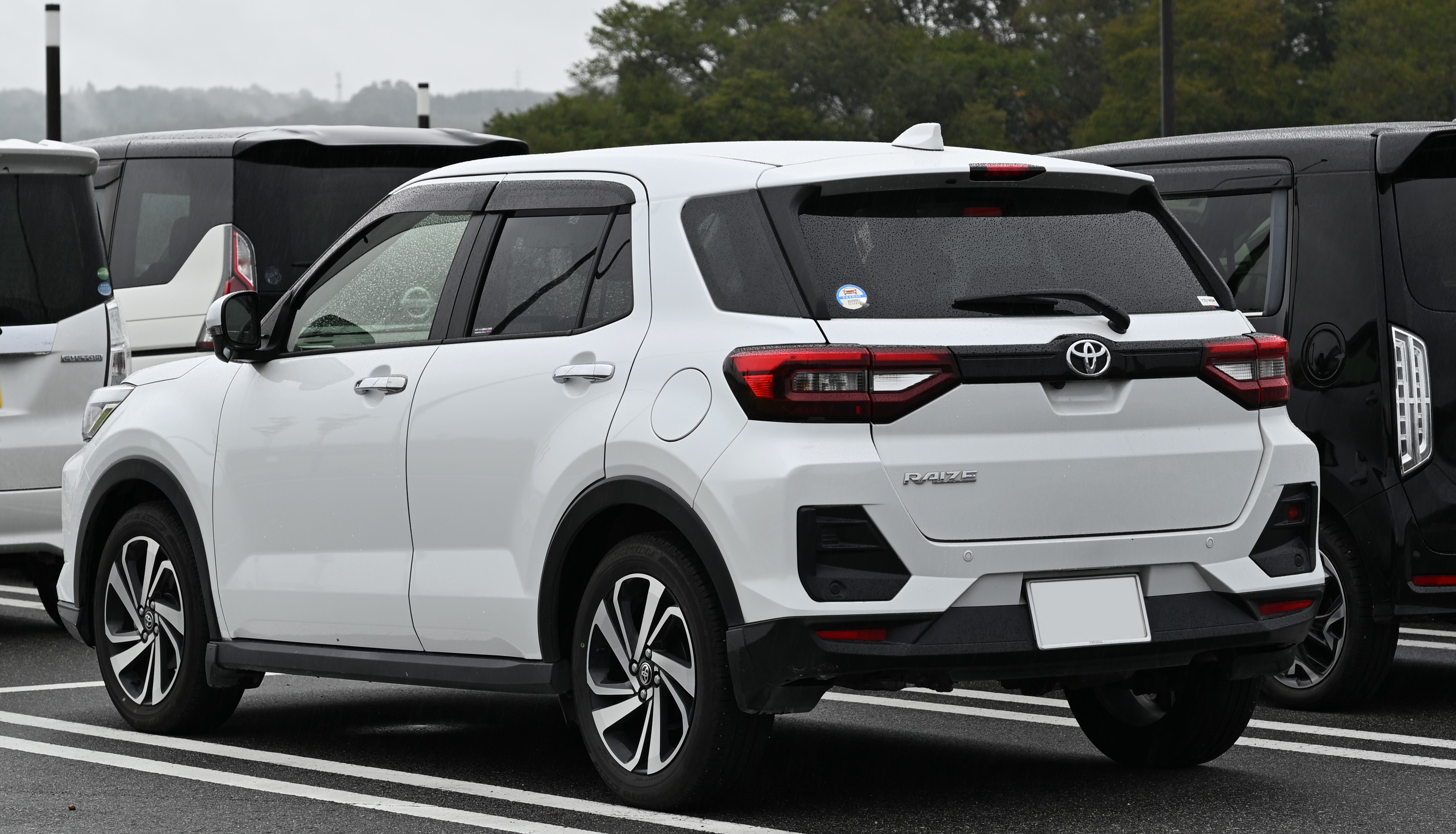
Toyota Raize Z (A210A, Japan)

==== Indonesia ====
In Indonesia, the Raize is offered in G and GR Sport grade levels. The G grade is powered by either a WA-VE or 1KR-VET engines mated to either a manual transmission or a CVT, while the GR Sport grade is only offered with the latter engine option mated to a CVT and also available with ASA (marketed as Toyota Safety Sense) as an option. The GR Sport variant was updated in January 2026.

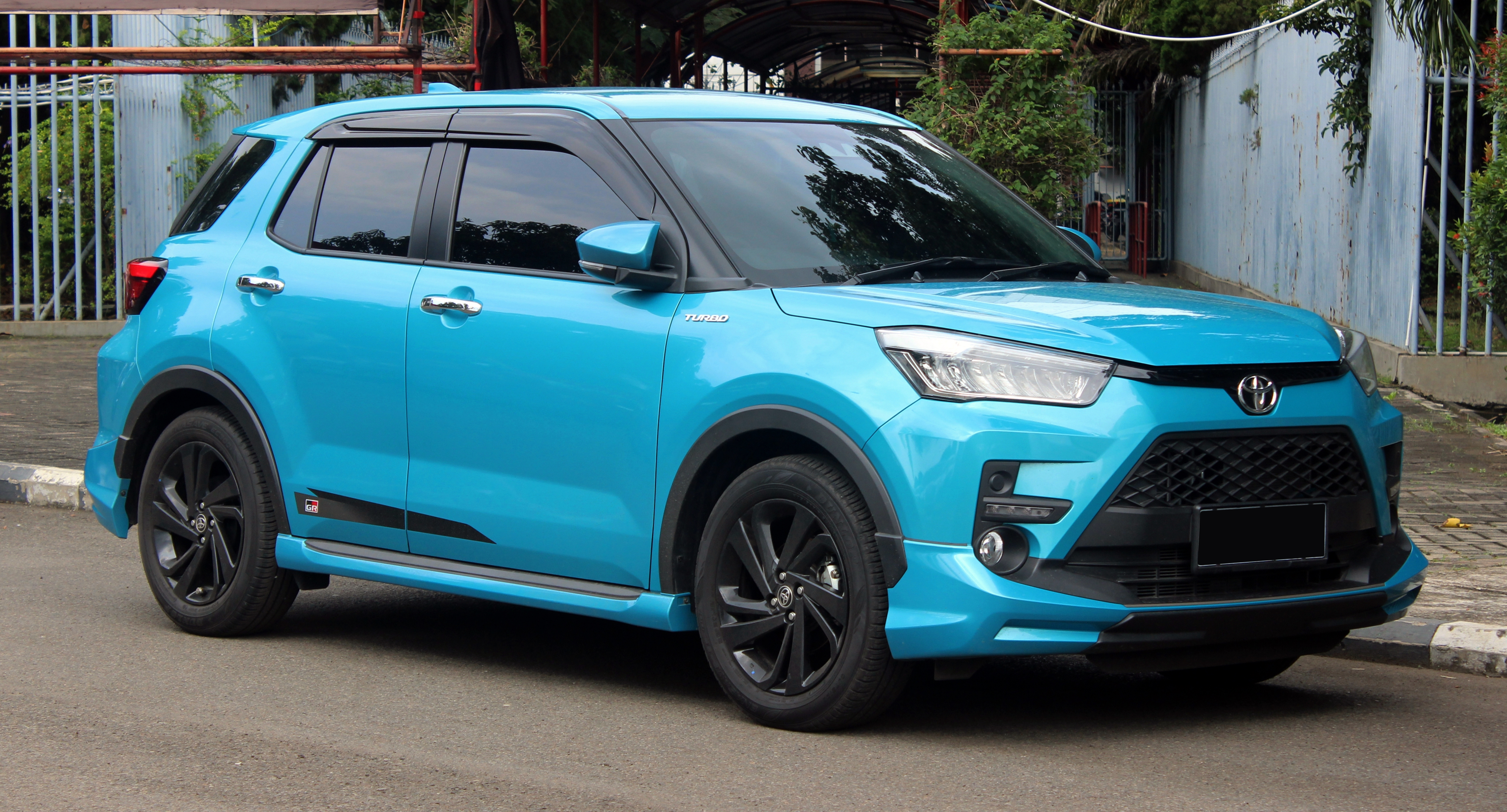
2021 Raize 1.0 Turbo GR Sport TSS (A250RA, Indonesia)

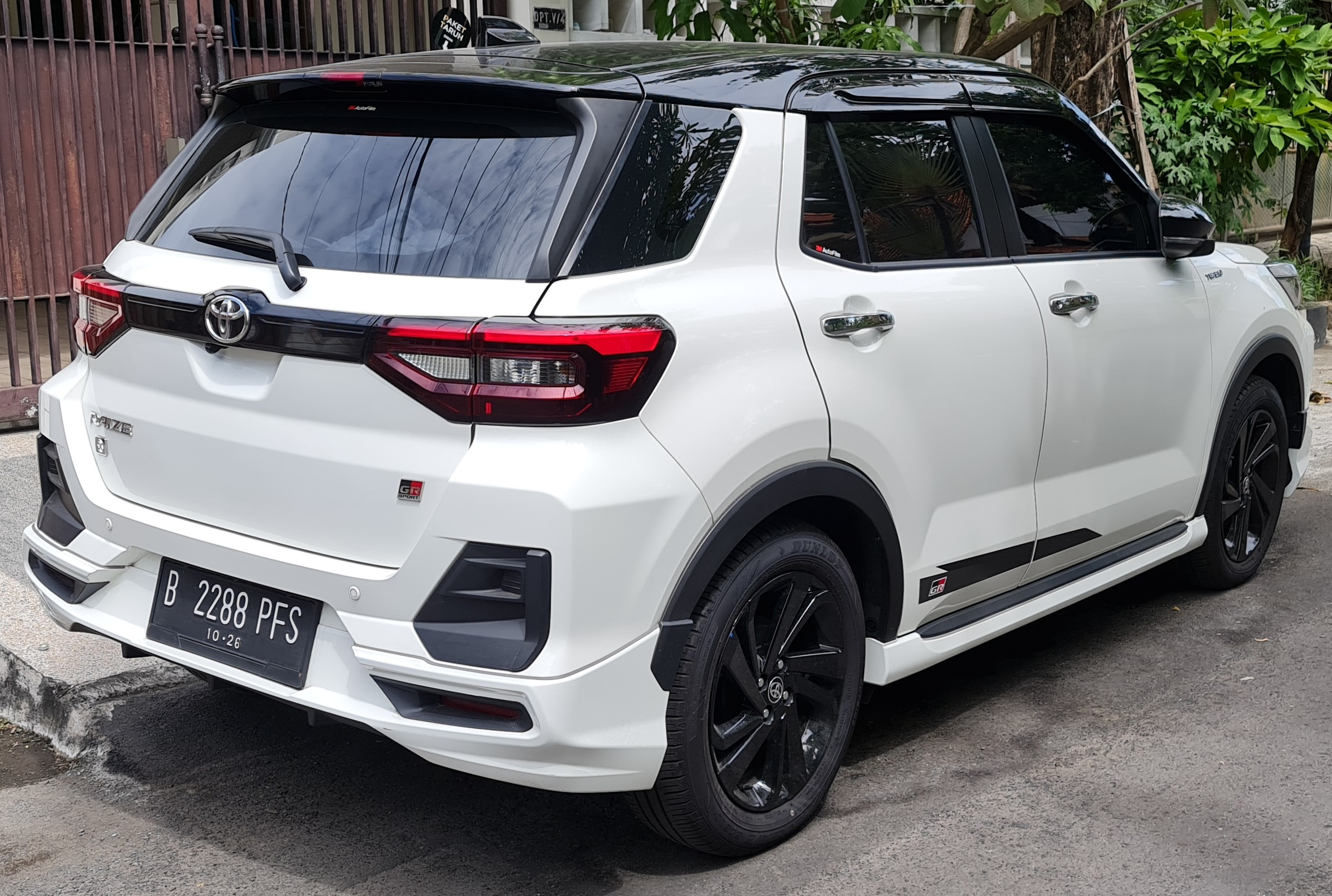
2021 Raize 1.0 Turbo GR Sport (A250RA, Indonesia), note the more pronounced rear bumper

The Raize is exported to various Asian markets, including Cambodia, Brunei, Vietnam, the UAE, Kuwait, Oman.

Since February 2022, it is also sold in the Philippines.

==== Cambodia ====
The Toyota Raize was first introduced to the Cambodian market in September 2021 as a fully imported model. It is offered in three grade levels—1.0 Turbo G CVT, 1.0 Turbo G CVT (Black Roof) and 1.0 Turbo GR Sport CVT—all powered by a 1.0-litre three-cylinder turbocharged petrol engine mated to a seven-speed CVT driving the front wheels.

Prices start at US$26,800 for the G CVT, US$27,200 for the Black Roof variant and US$28,000 for the GR Sport. Standard equipment includes LED headlamps, wireless Apple CarPlay and Android Auto, Bluetooth connectivity, and front and rear parking sensors, while the GR Sport adds a sporty body kit and 17-inch alloy wheels.

==== Americas ====
The Raize is available in some Latin America markets, as Mexico, where it is only available in a single grade, XLE with a 1KR-VET engine, mated to either a 5-speed manual or a CVT. Other markets include Costa Rica, Nicaragua, Chile and Uruguay.

== Subaru Rex ==
The Subaru-badged model is sold and marketed exclusively in Japan as the Subaru Rex since 11 November 2022. Sharing the identical styling (except emblems) with the Rocky, it is offered in G and Z grade levels with a WA-VE engine mated to a CVT. Four-wheel drive option (typical for Subaru vehicles) is not offered for the Rex. The production is capped at 150 units per month.

As of 12 June 2025, Subaru Rex is available in WA-VEX hybrid engine option.

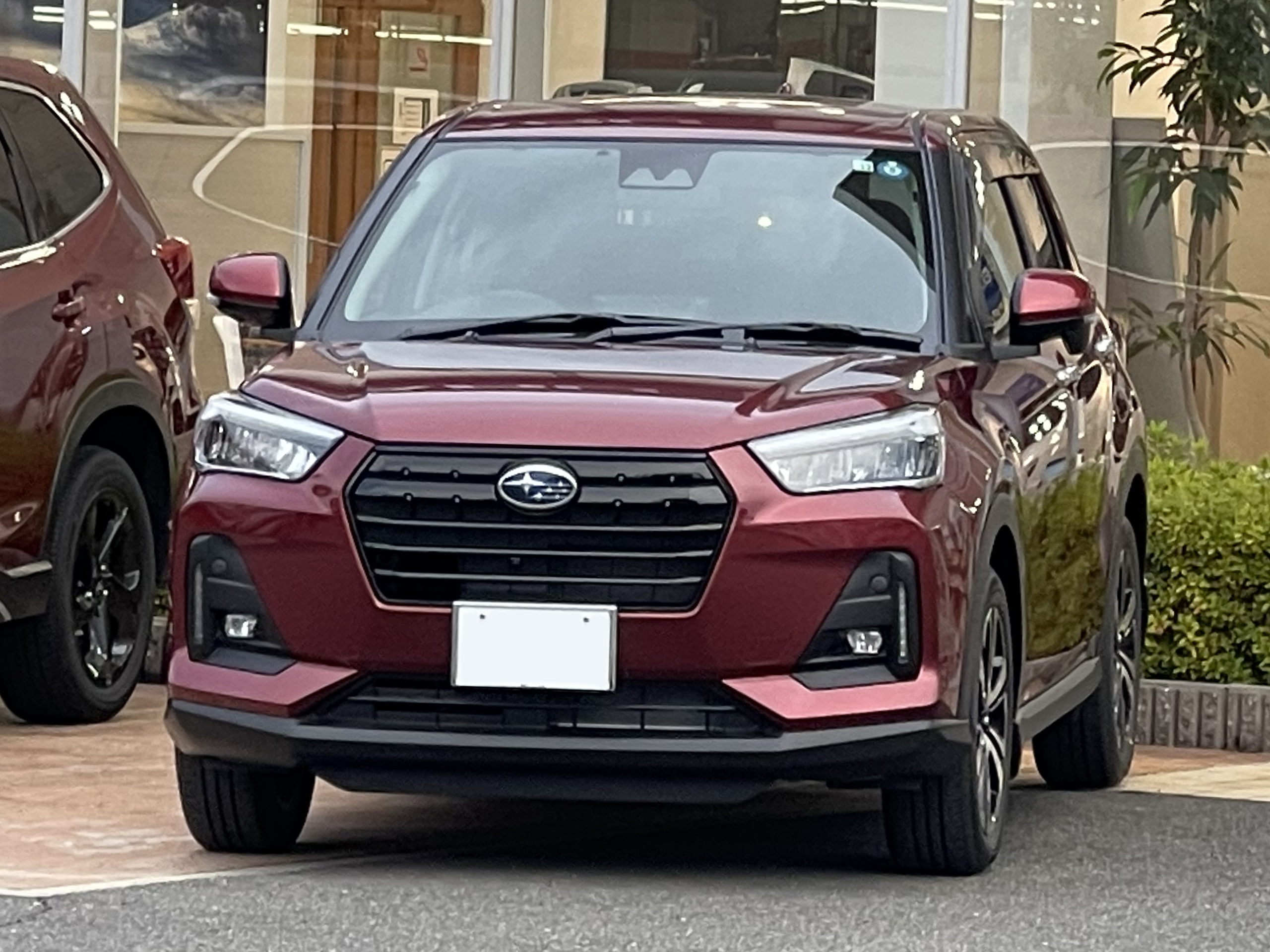
2022 Subaru Rex Z (A201F, Japan)

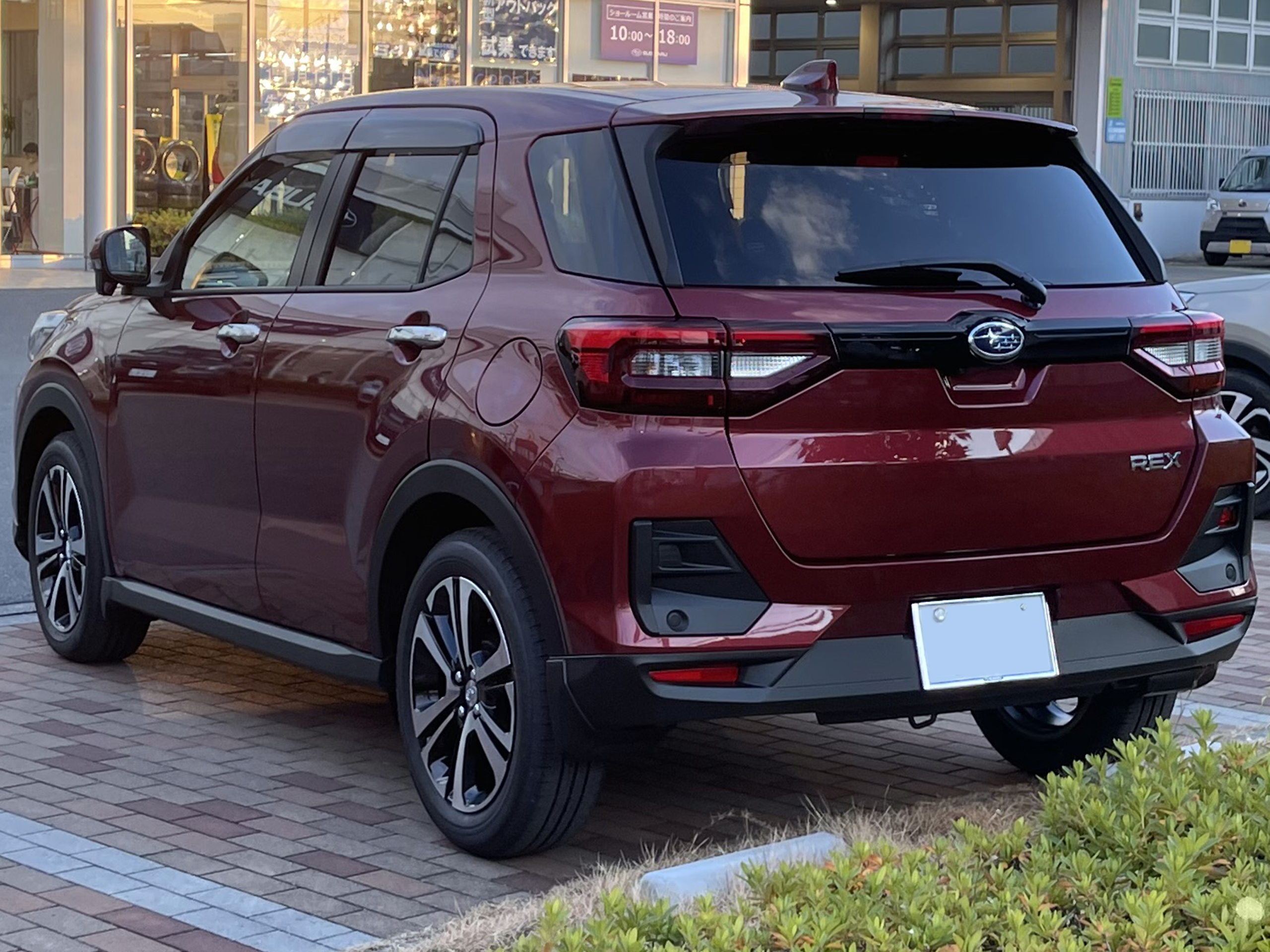
2022 Rex Z (A201F, Japan)

== Perodua Ativa ==
The Perodua Ativa was opened for booking on 19 February 2021 and launched in Malaysia on 3 March 2021. The name Ativa is derived from the Portuguese word ativo, meaning active or to get active. It is the first Perodua model to be built on the DNGA platform, the first Perodua with a turbocharged engine and the first one to use a CVT. It is only available with a 1KR-VET engine, and offered in X, H and AV grade levels. It is identified by the A270 model code.

It is longer by 70 mm (2.8 in), wider by 20 mm (0.8 in) and taller by 15 mm (0.6 in) than the Japanese-spec Rocky and Raize. This is due to the distinct design of the bumpers and a different suspension setup specific to the Ativa which rode higher and firmer. The Ativa also uses a metal tailgate like the A250 Rocky and Raize.

According to the company, the Ativa is built with 95 percent of locally produced parts, which is the highest ever of any Perodua model. Its engine is made by Perodua Engine Manufacturing in Rawang, Selangor, while its CVT is produced at Akashi Kikai in Sendayan, Negeri Sembilan.

In September 2022, the Japan-built Ativa Hybrid was launched as part of the subscription program for an "electric vehicle study" and "long-term mobility as a service market study". 300 units of the vehicle, which itself is an hybrid-electric Rocky with Perodua badges, were imported. The cars were not intended for retail sales.

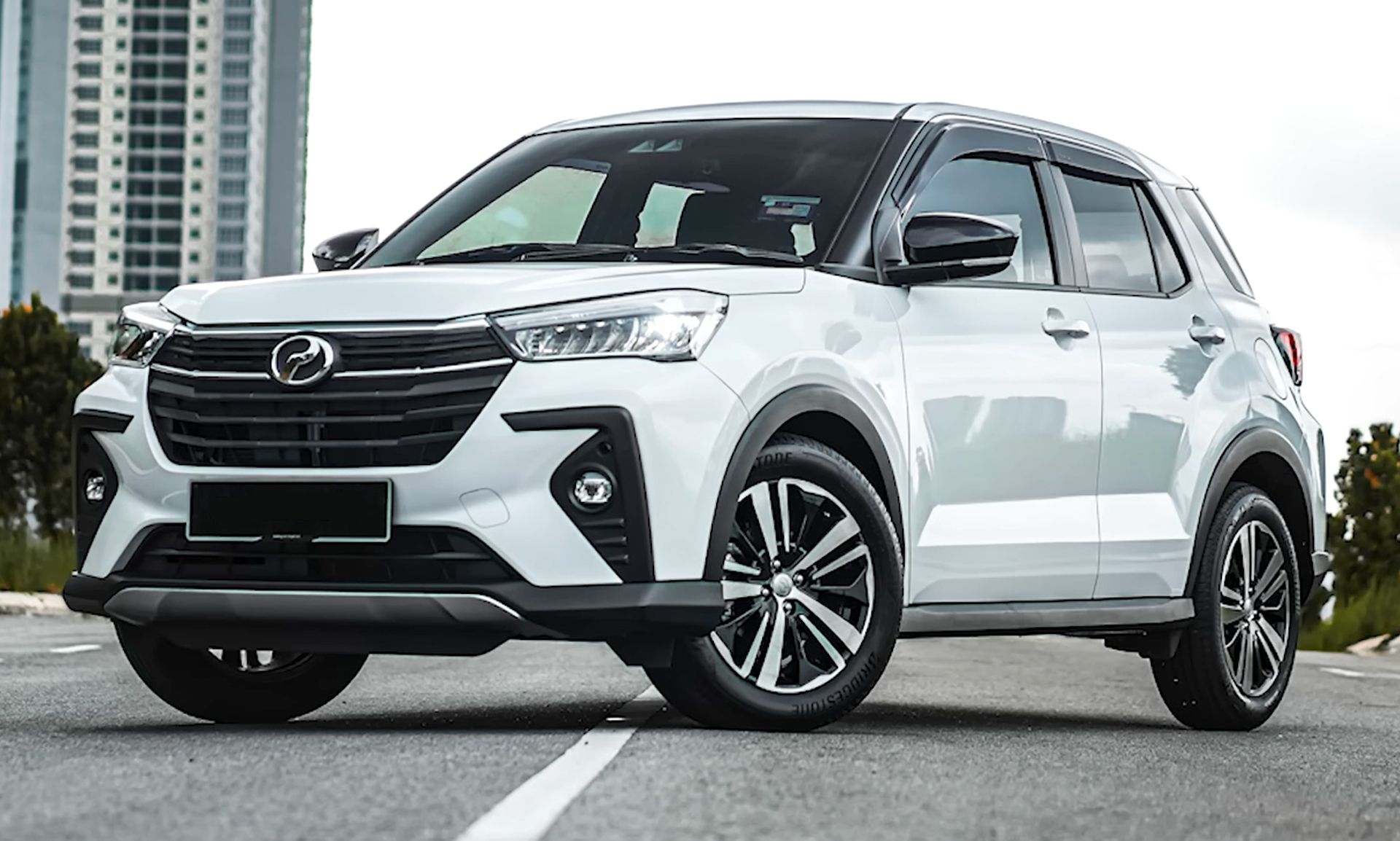
2021 Perodua Ativa H (A270RS, Malaysia)

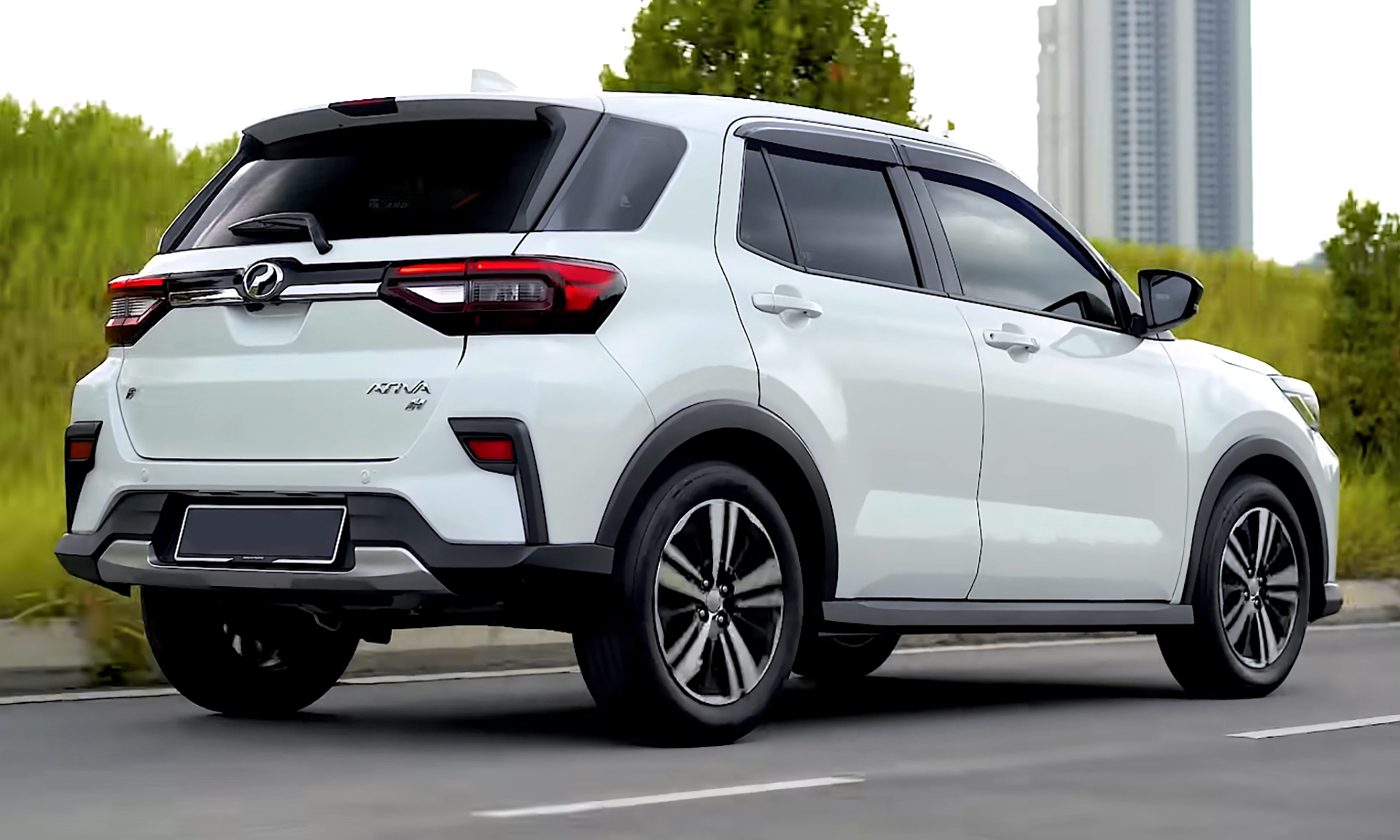
2021 Ativa H (A270RS, Malaysia)

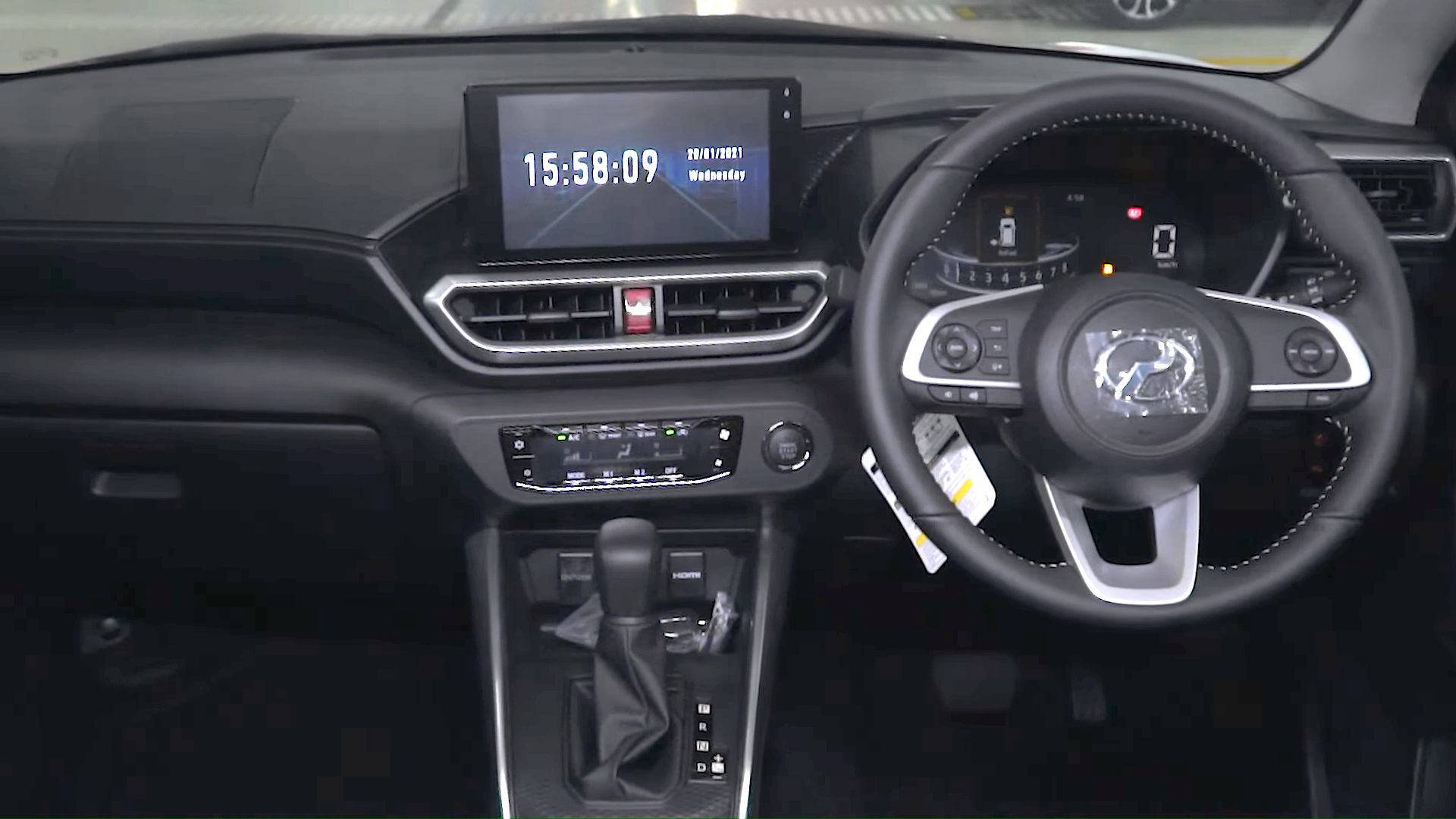
2021 Ativa H interior (Malaysia)

== Powertrain ==
The Rocky is available in three different powertrain options: a turbocharged 1.0-litre (996 cc) 1KR-VET three-cylinder engine that produces 72 kW (97 hp; 98 PS) and 140 N⋅m (100 lb⋅ft) of torque, a naturally-aspirated 1.2-litre (1,198 cc) WA-VE three-cylinder engine that produces 64–65 kW (86–87 hp; 87–88 PS) and 113 N⋅m (83 lb⋅ft), and a hybrid-electric 1.2-litre (1,198 cc) WA-VEX three-cylinder engine that produces 60 kW (80 hp; 82 PS) and 105 N⋅m (77 lb⋅ft). The first two engines is mated to either a 5-speed manual transmission or a "Dual-Mode CVT" (D-CVT). The hybrid-electric variant uses a series hybrid drivetrain, marketed as "e-Smart Hybrid" for Daihatsu and "Hybrid Synergy Drive" for Toyota.

In D-CVT, unlike traditional units, the transmission does not rely solely on belt drive, but also combining it with split gears. From low to medium speeds, the D-CVT functions like other CVT systems, while at higher speeds, the D-CVT shifts into its split mode, engaging the gear drive to achieve less energy loss. Daihatsu claimed the D-CVT was the world's first split-gear CVT system and would achieve improved fuel efficiency, acceleration feel and quietness.

For the hybrid-electric variant, the WA-VEX engine acts as a generator for the E1A electric motor that is mechanically connected to the driving wheels, which produces 78 kW (105 hp; 106 PS) and 170 N⋅m (130 lb⋅ft) of torque.

Type	Engine code	Displacement	Power	Torque	Electric motor	Battery	Transmission	Model code	Layout	Calendar years
Petrol	WA-VE	1,198 cc (1.2 L) I3	64 kW (86 hp; 87 PS) @ 6,000 rpm	113 N⋅m (11.5 kg⋅m; 83.3 lb⋅ft) @ 4,500 rpm	-	-	Dual Mode CVT (D-CVT)	A201 (Note: Manufactured in Japan)	FWD	2021–present
Petrol	WA-VE	1,198 cc (1.2 L) I3	65 kW (87 hp; 88 PS) @ 6,000 rpm	113 N⋅m (11.5 kg⋅m; 83.3 lb⋅ft) @ 4,500 rpm	-	-	5-speed manual D-CVT	A251 (Note: Manufactured in Indonesia)	FWD	2021–present
Petrol	1KR-VET	998 cc (1.0 L) I3	72 kW (97 hp; 98 PS) @ 6,000 rpm	140 N⋅m (14.3 kg⋅m; 103 lb⋅ft) @ 2,400–4,000 rpm	-	-	D-CVT	A200	FWD	2019–2021
Petrol	1KR-VET	998 cc (1.0 L) I3	72 kW (97 hp; 98 PS) @ 6,000 rpm	140 N⋅m (14.3 kg⋅m; 103 lb⋅ft) @ 2,400–4,000 rpm	-	-	D-CVT	A210	AWD	2019–present
Petrol	1KR-VET	998 cc (1.0 L) I3	72 kW (97 hp; 98 PS) @ 6,000 rpm	140 N⋅m (14.3 kg⋅m; 103 lb⋅ft) @ 2,400–4,000 rpm	-	-	5-speed manual D-CVT	A250	FWD	2021–present
Petrol	1KR-VET	998 cc (1.0 L) I3	72 kW (97 hp; 98 PS) @ 6,000 rpm	140 N⋅m (14.3 kg⋅m; 103 lb⋅ft) @ 2,400–4,000 rpm	-	-	D-CVT	A270 (Note: Manufactured in Malaysia (Perodua Ativa only))	FWD	2021–present
Petrol series hybrid	WA-VEX	1,198 cc (1.2 L) I3	Engine: 60 kW (80 hp; 82 PS) @ 5,600 rpm Motor: 78 kW (105 hp; 106 PS)	Engine: 105 N⋅m (10.7 kg⋅m; 77.4 lb⋅ft) @ 3,200–5,200 rpm Motor: 170 N⋅m (17.3 kg⋅m; 125 lb⋅ft)	E1A AC synchronous	4.3 Ah lithium-ion	-	A202	FWD	2021–present

== Safety ==
Latin NCAP 3.5 test results Toyota Raize + 2 Airbags (2024, similar to Euro NCAP 2017)
Test	Points	%
Overall:	1 /5 stars	
Adult occupant:	16.21	41%
Child occupant:	36.07	72%
Pedestrian:	28.17	59%
Safety assist:	25.00	58%

2019 Daihatsu Rocky / Toyota Raize (Japanese specification)
JNCAP [ja] scores
Overall stars	5/5 stars
Collision safety performance	85.7/100.0
Preventive safety performance	73.6/141.0

ASEAN NCAP test results Perodua Ativa (2021)
Test	Points
Overall:	5 /5 stars
Adult occupant:	37.48
Child occupant:	17.36
Safety assist:	18.57
Motorcyclist Safety:	10.00

== Recall ==
In January 2022, Daihatsu issued a recall notice on 3,421 units of the Japanese market Rocky e-Smart Hybrid produced from 1 November to 3 December 2021, which involved an anomaly in the control unit for the hybrid powertrain. The company stated that the affected units may have had a faulty ECU that may see "improper power generation", in which the internal combustion engine could stop while the vehicle is being driven. The problem would be solved by reprogramming the ECU itself.

In March 2022, another recall was issued for the Indonesian market Rocky and Raize, which both models received improper welding on the front fender aprons. These could cause abnormal sounds when the car passes through a damaged or bumpy road and under certain conditions, the aprons could possibly detach from the car. A total of 9,378 Rockys (produced from 28 April until 7 October 2021) and 14,777 Raizes (produced from November 2020 until October 2021) were affected.

In June 2023, another recall was issued for the Indonesian-made Rocky and Raize. One of the airbag ECU capacitors may malfunction, which may cause the airbag not to operate properly. Units that are affected were produced between December 2022 and January 2023.

In January 2024, another recall was issued for the Philippine-market Raize, along with the Avanza and Veloz. Due to an assembly fault at the brake caliper assembly line, the assembly tools interfered with the slide pin boots during assembly. This can cause damage to the pin boot. If the water enters in the slide pin boots, it can cause rust which may lead to the early wear of the brake pads. 4,345 units of the Raize made between September 12 and December 7, 2022 are affected.

In February 2025, another recall was issued for the Philippine-market Raize. In certain driving conditions, such as frequent braking in high altitudes, there is a possibility that the suction pressure in the brake booster could not be maintained as desired, thus making the brake pedal harder to press. This is due to improper programming of the engine ECU in some models. 28,828 units of the Raize (produced from 1 December 2021 until 15 July 2024) were affected by the recall.

== Sales ==
In 2020, the Raize became the second best-selling regular car model (non-kei models) in Japan, after the Yaris series, which includes the regular Yaris hatchback, the GR Yaris and the Yaris Cross.

=== Daihatsu Rocky ===
Year	Japan	Indonesia	
Year	Japan	Petrol	HEV
2019	7,808	—	—
2020	31,153	—	—
2021	21,392	10,737	—
2022	22,223	9,885	—
2023	15,252	5,328	—
2024	10,127	4,299	—
2025		2,787	40

=== Toyota Raize ===
Year	Japan	Indonesia	Mexico	Chile	Philippines	Vietnam
2019	16,601	—				
2020	126,038	—				
2021	81,880	22,923	788			769
2022	83,620	24,092	7,189	3,607	13,279	6,900
2023	64,995	17,499	9,281	3,755	17,504	4,546
2024	51,225	13,134	8,890		18,024	4,984
2025		10,463				

=== Perodua Ativa ===
Year	Malaysia (Note: Figures based on registration for Perodua Ativa (Malaysia))
2021	26,841
2022	34,111
2023	35,542
2024	36,039
2025	38,609

=== Subaru Rex ===
Year	Japan
2022	269
2023	2,832
2024	1,317
