= Balboa Park =

Balboa Park may refer to:

- Balboa Park (San Diego), an urban park in San Diego, California
- Balboa Park, San Francisco, a public park in San Francisco, California
- Balboa Park station, a San Francisco train station
- Anthony C. Beilenson Park, formerly Balboa Park, in the Lake Balboa neighborhood of Los Angeles, California
- Balboa Park, in the Panchimalco district of San Salvador, El Salvador
- "Balboa Park", a song by Bruce Springsteen on his 1995 album The Ghost of Tom Joad
