= Daihatsu Rocky =

Automotive nameplate by Daihatsu

The Daihatsu Rocky (Japanese: ダイハツ・ロッキー, Hepburn: Daihatsu Rokkī) is an automobile nameplate used by the Japanese automobile manufacturer Daihatsu since 1984 for three different SUV models:

- Daihatsu Rocky (F70), an export version of the Rugger sold between 1984 and 2002
- Daihatsu Rocky (F300), a ladder frame-based mini SUV sold in Japan and some international markets between 1989 and 2002
- Daihatsu Rocky (A200), a subcompact crossover sold since 2019

The Rocky was popular in Australia in the 1980s and 1990s, largely drawing from the success in Japan, where it was known as the Lovibond Rocky.

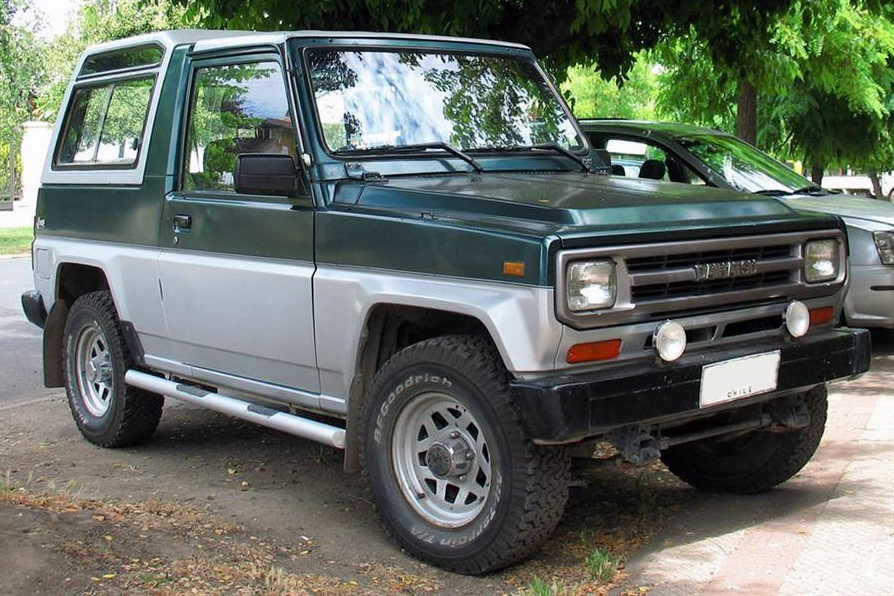
F70

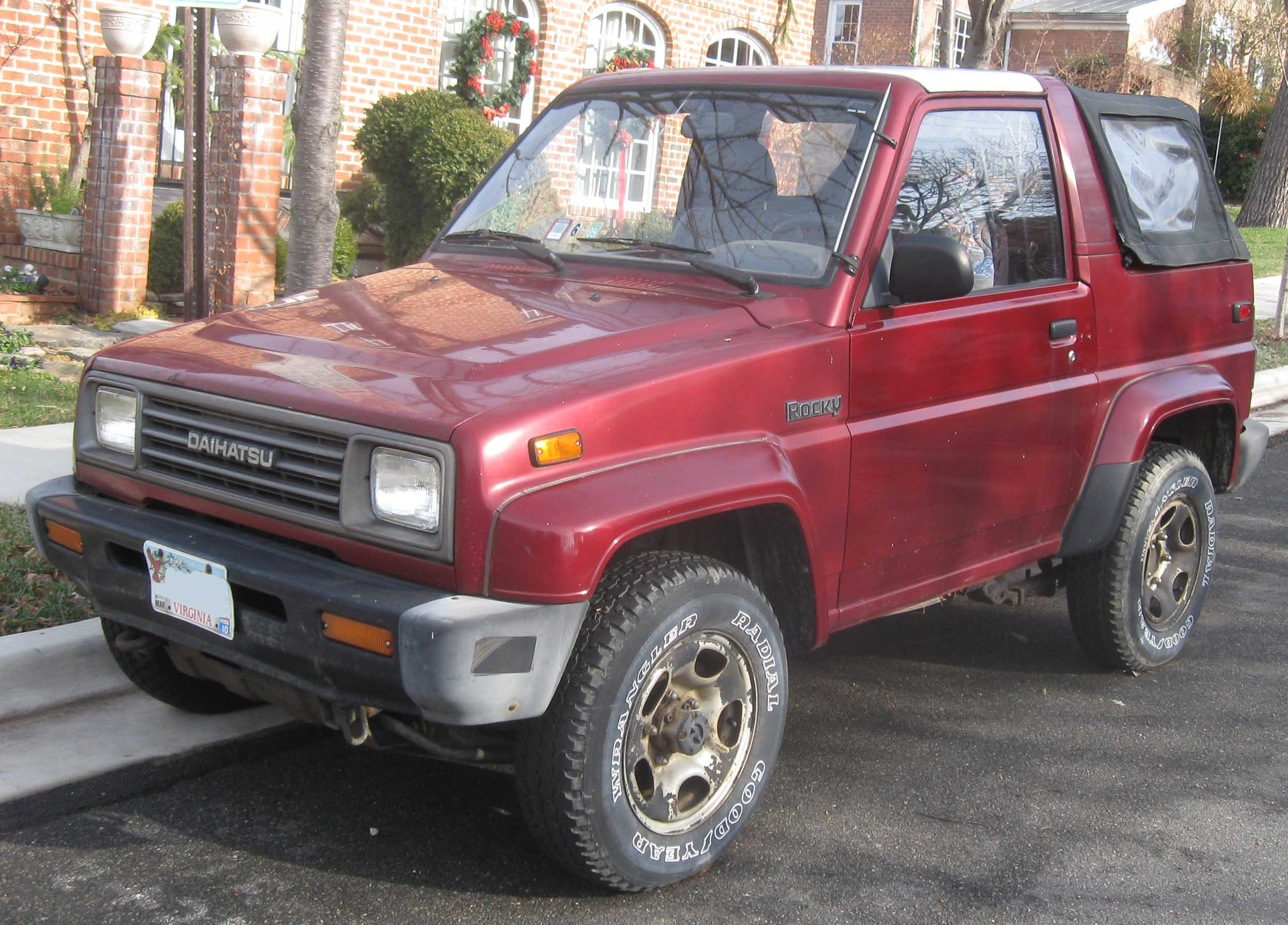
F300

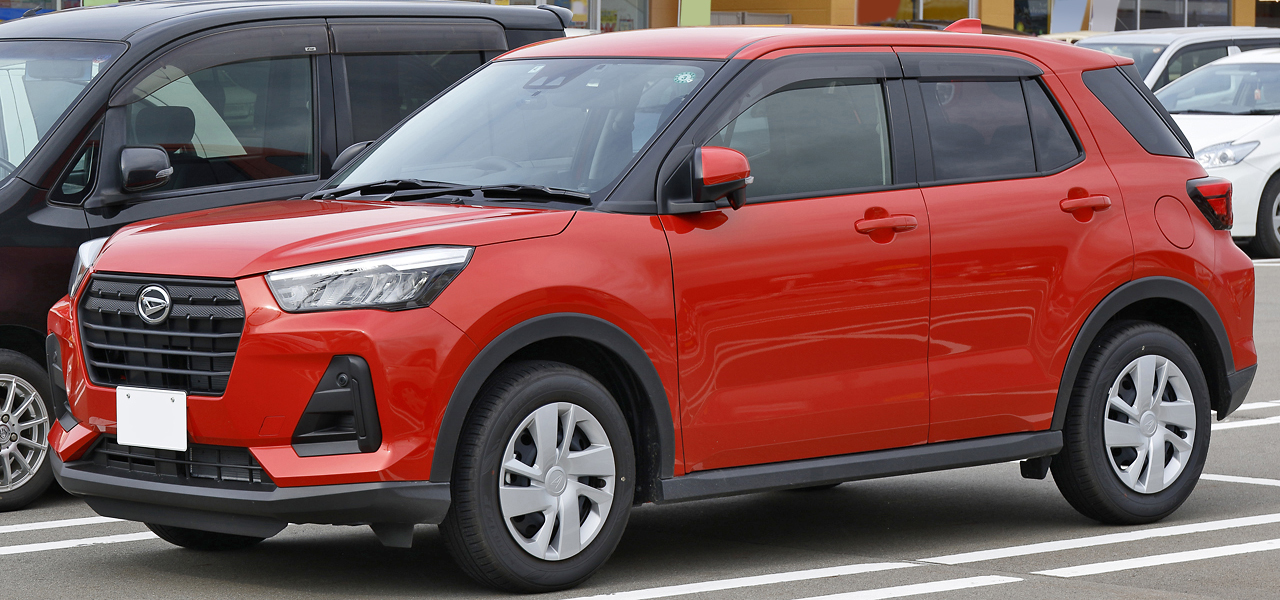
A200
