= Rockey's Air Strip =

Coordinates: 40°34′55.14″N 086°10′2.98″W

Rockey's Air Strip (FAA LID: II10) is an airport located in unincorporated Cass County, Indiana, United States. The airport is located east of Galveston, Indiana.

The airport is privately owned and managed by R. E. Rocky.
