= Balboa, Cauca =

Balboa
- Municipality and town
- Flag

- Location of the municipality and town of Balboa in the Cauca Department of Colombia.

- Location in Colombia
- Coordinates: 2°2′37″N 77°13′11″W
- Country: Colombia
- Department: Cauca Department

Area
  - Total: 360 km^{2} (140 sq mi)
- Elevation: 1,200 m (3,900 ft)

Population (Census 2018)
  - Total: 18,910
- Time zone: UTC-5 (Colombia Standard Time)
- Climate: Am

Balboa is a town and municipality in the Cauca Department, Colombia.

Founded by Order No. 02 on 3 November 1967, the municipality covers an area of 360 km^{2} (139 sq mi) and has a population of 27,030. The population is primarily engaged in agriculture and ranching.
