= Dr. A. E. and Phila Jane Rockey House =

House in Multnomah County, Oregon, U.S.

- U.S. National Register of Historic Places
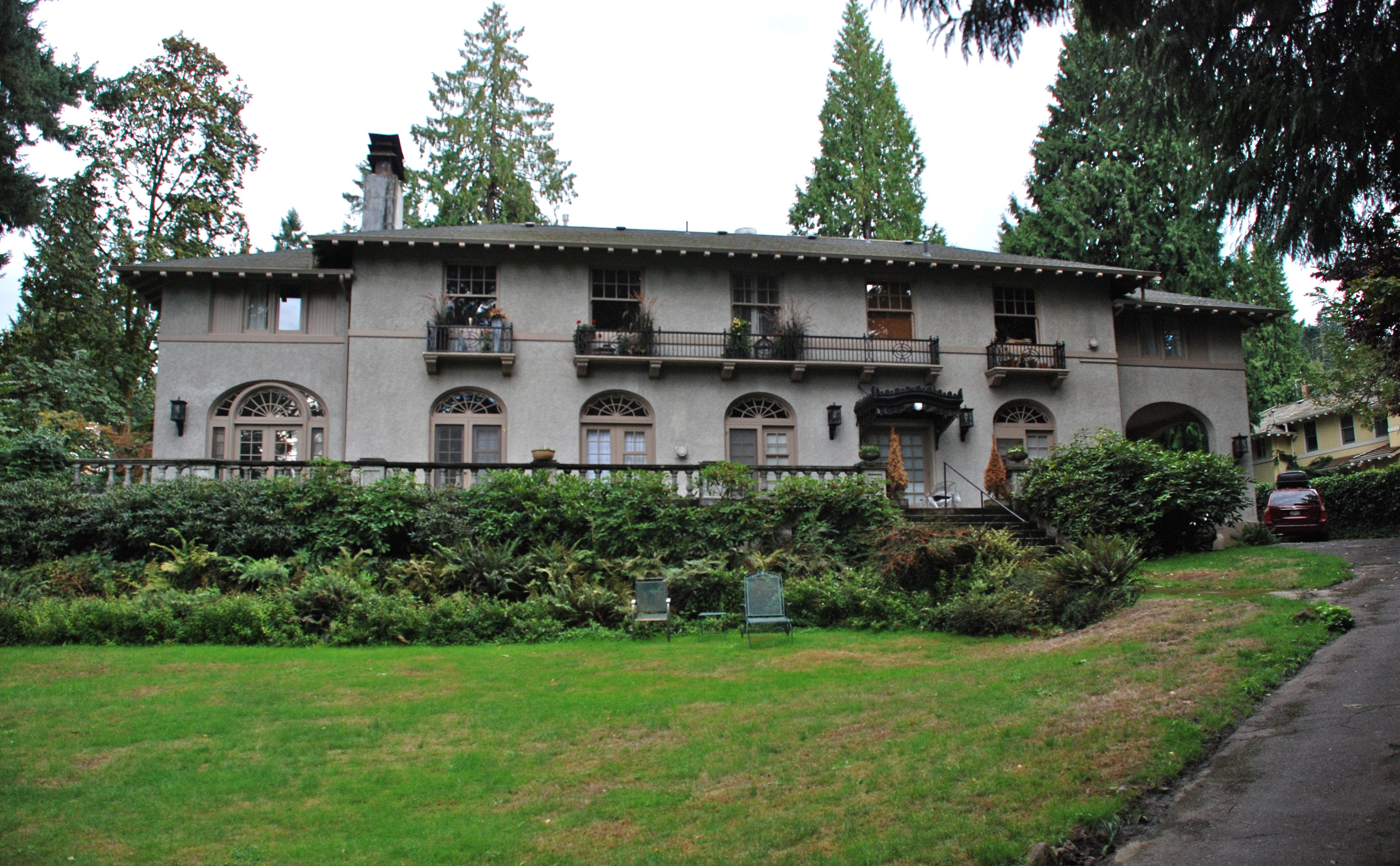
- House in 2013

- Location within Portland, Oregon
- Nearest city: Portland, Oregon
- Coordinates: 45°27′3″N 122°39′34″W
- Area: 1 acre (0.40 ha)
- Built: 1913
- Architect: Folger Johnson
- Architectural style: Late 19th And 20th Century Revivals, Mediterranean
- NRHP reference No.: 85003036
- Added to NRHP: December 2, 1985

The Dr. A. E. and Phila Jane Rockey House, also known as Rockholm, in the outskirts of Portland, Oregon was built in 1913. It was listed on the National Register of Historic Places in 1985.

It was designed by architect Folger Johnson.

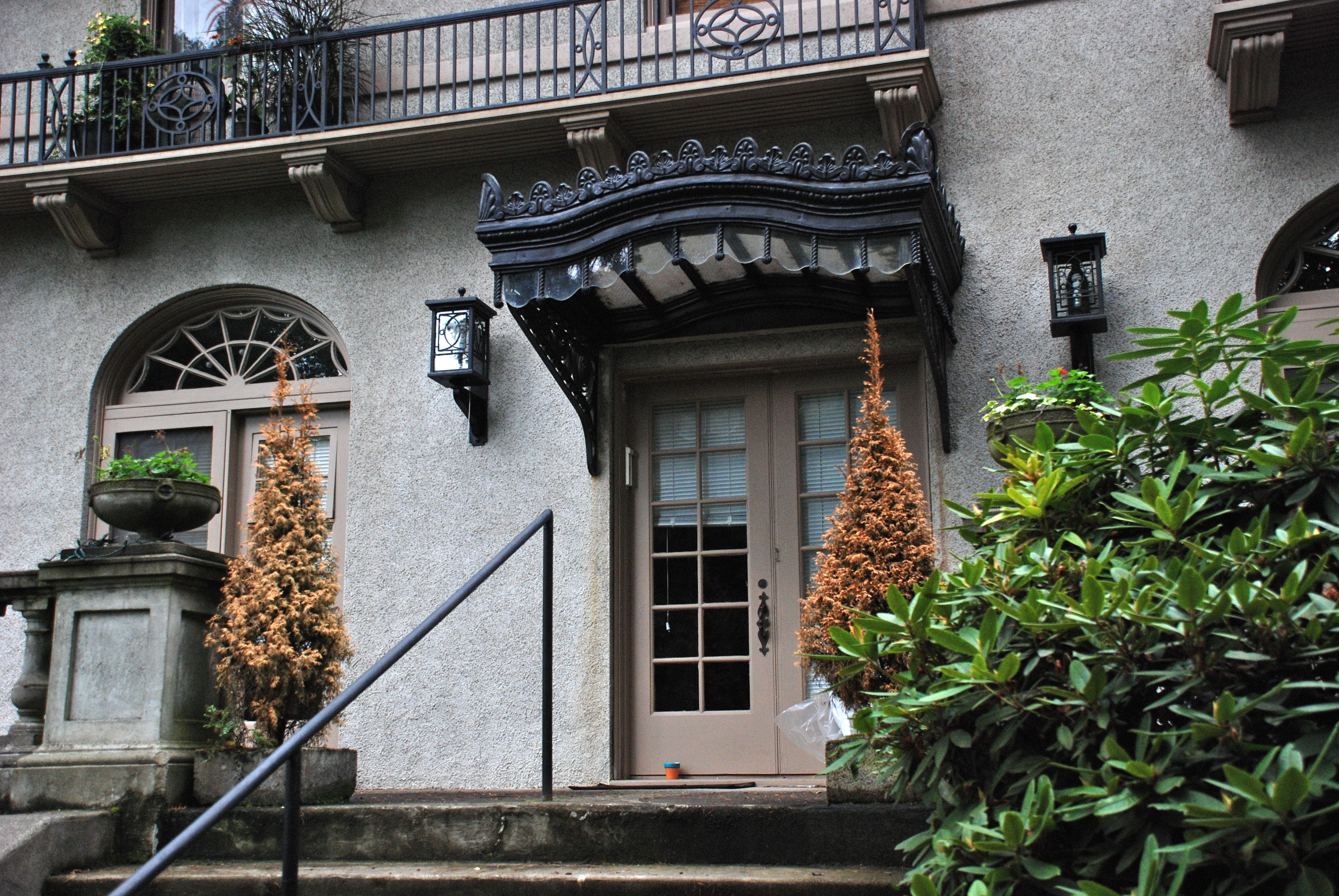
Former main entrance

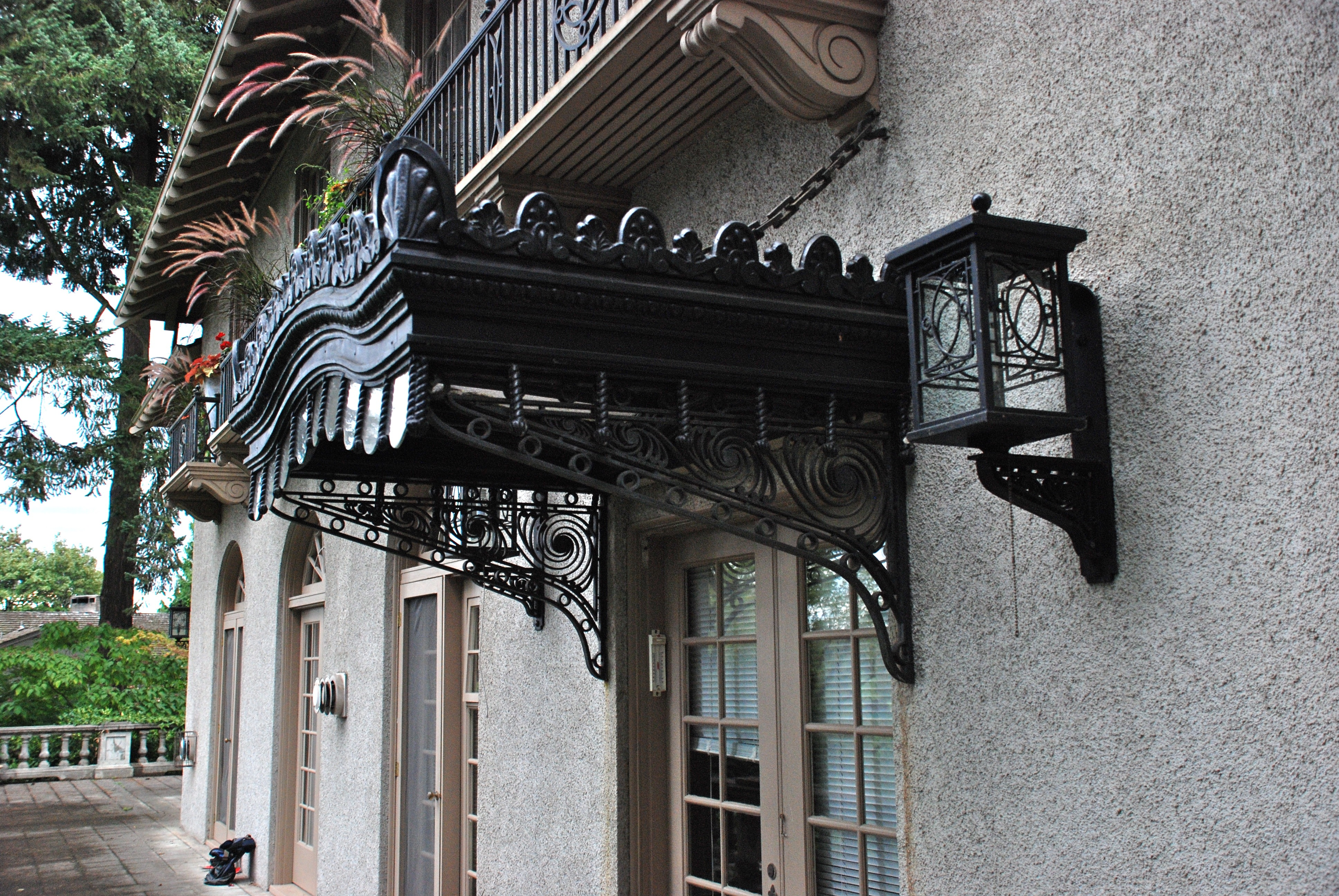
Marquee detail
