= Rockey Vaccarella =

American activist

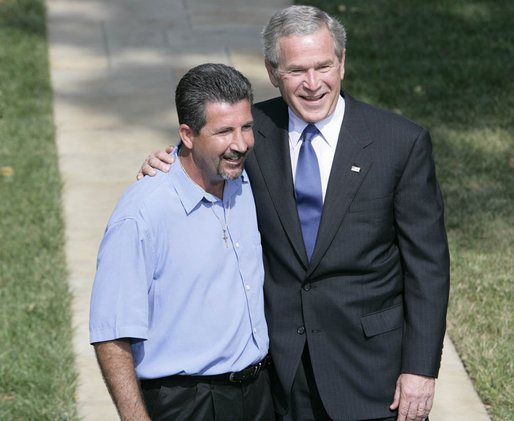
Rockey Vaccarella meets with President Bush on August 23, 2006.

Rockey Vaccarella is a Hurricane Katrina survivor and activist from St. Bernard Parish, Louisiana. In August 2006, he drove his Federal Emergency Management Agency trailer to the White House to thank President George W. Bush for the mobile homes provided to Katrina victims by the federal government. He is also a former GOP candidate for city council in St. Bernard Parish.

== Bush press conference with Vaccarella ==
President Bush and Vaccarella met together in a White House press conference on August 23, 2006. Bush began by introducing Vaccarella:

I just had coffee with Rockey Vaccarella, St. Bernard Parish, Louisiana. He caught my attention because he decided to come up to Washington, D.C. and make it clear to me and others here in the government that there's people down there still hurting in south Louisiana, and along the Gulf Coast. And Rock is a plain-spoken guy. He's the kind of fellow I feel comfortable talking to.

Vaccarella thanked the President for his efforts in aiding Katrina victims:

I just wish the President could have another term in Washington. ... You know, I wish you had another four years, man. If we had this President for another four years, I think we'd be great.

== Political response ==
Democratic Minority Leader Nancy Pelosi called the press conference a "public relations blitz that the survivors of Katrina [could] ill afford."
