= Rock Island =

Rock Island may refer to:

- islets known as rocks or rock islands

== Places ==
- Rock Island Township (disambiguation)

=== Canada ===
==== Islands ====
- Rock Island (Nunavut)
- Rock Islands (Lake Nipissing), an island in Ontario

==== Communities ====
- Rock Island, Quebec, a community within the ville of Stanstead

=== United States ===
- Rock Island II Site, Rock Island, Door County, Wisconsin; an archaeological site

==== Lakes ====
- Rock Island Lake, Elmore County, Idaho; a lake
- Rock Island Pool, Washington State; a reservoir lake

==== Islands ====
- Rock Island (Connecticut), an island in the List of islands of Connecticut
- Rock Island (Lake County, Montana), an island in Flathead Lake
- Rock Island (Sanders County, Montana), an island in Noxon Reservoir
- Rock Island, formerly known as Fortification Rock in Nevada in Lake Mead
- Rock Island (New York) on the Saint Lawrence River
- Rock Island, in Lake Bonaparte (New York)
- Rock Island (Oregon), in the Willamette River
- Rock Island (Rhode Island)
- Rock Island (Wisconsin)
  - Rock Island State Park (Wisconsin)

==== Communities ====
- Rock Island, Florida
- Rock Island, Illinois, largest city in the U.S. with that name
  - Davenport-Moline-Rock Island, a multi-state conurbation
- Rock Island County, Illinois
  - Rock Island Arsenal, Illinois
- Rock Island, Oklahoma
- Rock Island, Tennessee
- Rock Island, Colorado County, Texas
- Rock Island, Washington County, Texas
- Glenrio, New Mexico and Texas, once Rock Island, Deaf Smith County, Texas
- Rock Island, Washington

=== Elsewhere ===
- Rock Island (Ireland)
- Rock Islands, Palau
- Rock Island (Trinidad and Tobago)

== Transportation ==
- Rock Island Depot (disambiguation)
- Rock Island Bridge (disambiguation)
- Chicago, Rock Island and Pacific Railroad, a railway company, known as the Rock Island Line
  - 1894 Rock Island railroad wreck, a train sabotage which killed 11 near Lincoln, Nebraska
  - Rock Island Snow Plow No. 95580, a railway plow
  - Rock Island 886, a steam locomotive
- Rock Island District, a commuter rail line in Chicago
- Rock Island Light (Rock Island) a lighthouse on the Saint-Lawrence River, in Jefferson, County, New York State, USA

== Film and television ==
- Rock Island Mysteries, a 2022 Australian children's drama TV series

== Music ==
- Rock Island 2002, a music event held in 2002 on the Isle of Wight

=== Albums ===
- Rock Island (Jethro Tull album)
- Rock Island (Palm album)

=== Songs ===
- "Rock Island Line", a blues/folk song by Leadbelly
- "Rock Island", a song from the musical The Music Man

== Other uses ==
- Rock Island State Park (disambiguation)
- Rock Island Trail (disambiguation)
- Rock Island High School, Rock Island, Illinois, USA
- Rock Island Arsenal, Rock Island, Illinois, USA; historic arsenal on Mississippi River
  - Rock Island Arsenal Museum
  - Rock Island National Cemetery
- Rock Island Islanders, Rock Island, Illinois, USA; a minor league baseball team

== See also ==
- Rock Island Line (disambiguation)
- Rock Island M200, pistol
- Battle of Rock Island Rapids (War of 1812) in Illinois
- Hurd v. Rock Island Bridge Co. (1857) a law case fought by lawyer Abraham Lincoln
- Rock (disambiguation)
- The Rock (disambiguation), including islands known as "The Rock(s)"
- Rocky Island (disambiguation)
