= Rock Island Railroad Bridge =

Rock Island Railroad Bridge may refer to:

- Rock Island Railroad Bridge (Columbia River), at Rock Island, Washington
- Rock Island Bridge (Kansas City), crossing the Kansas River in Kansas City, Kansas and Missouri
- Rock Island Swing Bridge, crossing the Mississippi River between Inver Grove Heights and St. Paul Park, Minnesota
- Government Bridge, crossing the Mississippi River between Rock Island, Illinois and Davenport, Iowa
- Harry S. Truman Bridge, crossing the Missouri River between Jackson County and Clay County, Missouri, built by the Rock Island Railroad
- Harahan Bridge, crossing the Mississippi River between Memphis, Tennessee and Arkansas, also called the Rock Island Bridge

== See also ==
- Rock Island Bridge (disambiguation)
