= Rock Island Bridge =

Rock Island Bridge may refer to:

- Rock Island Bridge (Kansas City, Kansas), crossing the Kansas River in Kansas City, Kansas and Missouri
- Rock Island Centennial Bridge, crossing the Mississippi River between Rock Island, Illinois and Davenport, Iowa
- Government Bridge, crossing the Mississippi River between Rock Island, Illinois and Davenport, Iowa at the location of the first "Rock Island Bridge"
- Harahan Bridge, crossing the Mississippi River between Memphis, Tennessee and Arkansas, also called the Rock Island Bridge

== See also ==
- Rock Island Railroad Bridge (disambiguation)
- Rock Island (disambiguation)
