= Rock Island State Park =

Rock Island State Park can refer to:

- Rock Island State Park (Tennessee)
- Rock Island State Park (Wisconsin)

== See also ==
- Rock Island Trail State Park (disambiguation)
- Rock Island (disambiguation)
