= Rock Island Line (disambiguation) =

The Rock Island Line is a common name for the Chicago, Rock Island and Pacific Railroad.

Rock Island Line may also refer to:

- Rock Island Line (album), a Johnny Cash album
- "Rock Island Line" (song), a traditional song
- Rock Island District, a Metra commuter rail line

== See also ==
- Rock Island Clean Line, an electrical distribution trunk line in the U.S. Midwest
- Rock Island Southern Railway, Illinois, USA
- Peoria and Rock Island Railroad, Illinois, USA
- Rock Island (disambiguation)
- Island Line (disambiguation)
