= Rock Island Township =

Rock Island Township may refer to the following townships in the United States:

- Rock Island Township, Rock Island County, Illinois
- Rock Island Township, Williams County, North Dakota

== See also ==
- Rock Island County
- Rock Island (disambiguation)
- Rock Township (disambiguation)
