= Chester Thordarson =

Icelandic-American inventor

Chester H. Thordarson
- Born: May 12, 1867; Iceland (Kingdom of Denmark)
- Died: 6 January 1945 (aged 77); Chicago, Illinois
- Resting place: Rock Island, Wisconsin
- Education: dropped out of 7th grade at age 20
- Engineering career
- Discipline: Electrical engineering
- Projects: Alternating current, high-voltage, high-frequency power experiments, transformer design, transformer manufacturing
- Significant design: Power grid, electrical transformer

Chester Hjortur Thordarson (May 12, 1867 – January 6, 1945) — born Hjörtur Þórðarson — was an Icelandic-American inventor and manufacturer of electrical apparatus who eventually held nearly a hundred technology patents related to transformers, inductors, high voltage coils, and more.

== Biography ==
Thordarson immigrated to the United States from Iceland in 1873 with his parents Gudrun Grimsdotter and Thordur Arnason. In 1887, Thordarson took a job in Chicago, Illinois, working for Chicago Edison Co. In 1895, he founded the Thordarson Electric Manufacturing Company, a manufacturing company in Chicago that produced industrial and commercial transformers. Thordarson's company is now called Thordarson Meissner, Inc. and has locations in Mount Carmel, Illinois, and Henderson, Nevada.

He was instrumental in the development of the modern energy transmission grid with his work in transformers. He achieved his first distinction at the 1904 World's Fair in St. Louis, where for the Purdue University exhibit he designed and built the first million-volt transformer. For his efforts he won the fair's gold medal.

== Legacy ==
=== Rock Island ===
In 1910, Thordarson began purchasing property on Rock Island, an island off the tip Wisconsin's Door Peninsula. Thordarson established a private vacation retreat on Rock Island. He was intensely interested in preserving the island's natural beauty. In 1965 the state of Wisconsin purchased Rock Island from his heirs. Thordarson's former estate has been designated Rock Island State Park. His buildings, including the water tower, were added to the National Register of Historic Places as the Thordarson Estate Historic District during 1985.

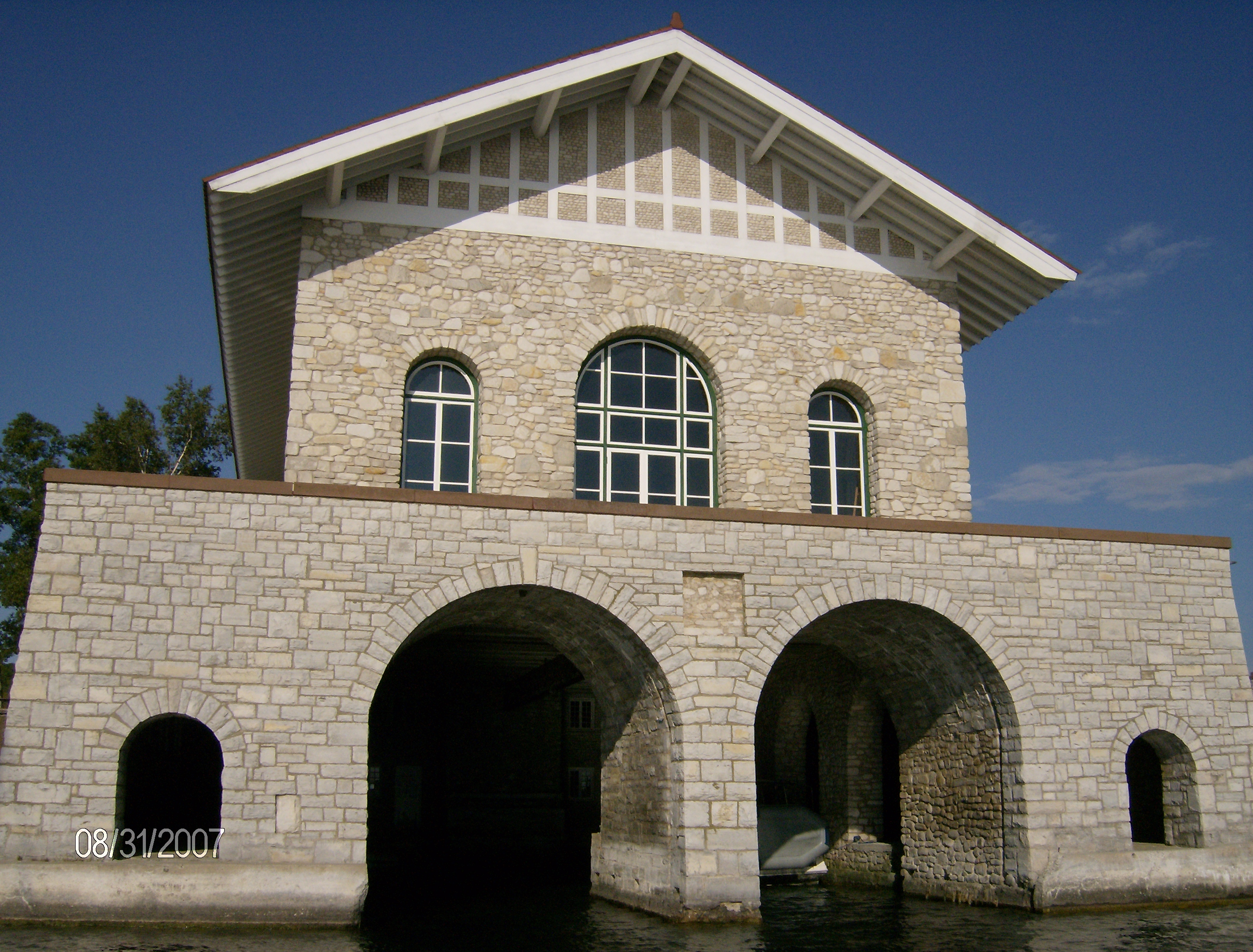
Chester Thordarson's boathouse on Rock Island

=== Book collection ===
Thordarson bequeathed his book collection to the University of Wisconsin. The Thordarson collection was estimated to be worth one million dollars in 1945 (equivalent to $17.9 million in 2025) and led to the establishment of the rare books room of the University of Wisconsin Memorial Library. Jen Christian Bay, a member of the Bibliographical Society of America, commented on the collection in 1929:

- "Of William Copland, The Craft of Grafting (1560), two copies are known, one in the Thordarson Collection"
- "Of the greatest [herbal] of all, the Hortus Sanitatis, Mr. Thordarson's copy of the edition of 1561 is a remarkably beautiful copy...."
- [Of the 1540 A Boke of the Proertyes of Herbes:] "This book is one of Mr. Thordarson's discoveries; no copy is known in any other library."
- [Of H. Baker's The Wellspring of Sciences:] "The British Museum seemingly possesses no copy with an earlier date than 1574. Mr Thordarson's copy [of 1564] seems unique."

== Awards ==
Among his awards and honors, the University of Wisconsin and the University of Iceland conferred honorary doctorate degrees. He was awarded medals from the Louisiana Purchase Exposition in 1904 and the Panama–Pacific International Exposition in 1916. King Christian X of Denmark presented Thordarson with the Order of the Falcon in 1939.

== Death ==
Thordarson died of heart failure in Chicago, Illinois on January 6, 1945.

== See also ==
- Charles Proteus Steinmetz – a contemporaneous electrical pioneer in alternating current and high voltage research
- Nikola Tesla
