= Wheels O' Time Museum =

- Established: 1977
- Location: 1710 W Woodside Dr; Dunlap postal address, Illinois 61525; United States
- Coordinates: 40°50′1″N 89°37′9″W
- Executive director: Laura Evancho
- President: John Amdall – Interim President
- Website: wheelsotime.org

Wheels O' Time Museum is a museum in Medina Township, Peoria County, Illinois, United States, with a Dunlap postal address.

== History ==
The Wheels O’ Time Museum was founded in 1977. It opened to the public in 1983. In 2017 the museum became a registered 501(c)(3) not-for-profit corporation. The museum operates from May to October, excluding holidays.

== Exhibits ==
Museum exhibits include Rock Island 886, a 4-6-2 Pacific type steam locomotive built in 1910 by the American Locomotive Company for the Rock Island Railroad and two old railroad passenger cars. A giant Lego exhibit opened in May 2022, donated by the family of the man who built it. A LeTourneau Metal House, an example of prefabricated housing built during the Great Depression, is also on display. The collection includes many antique cars.
