= Water Tower (Rock Island, Wisconsin) =

- U.S. National Register of Historic Places
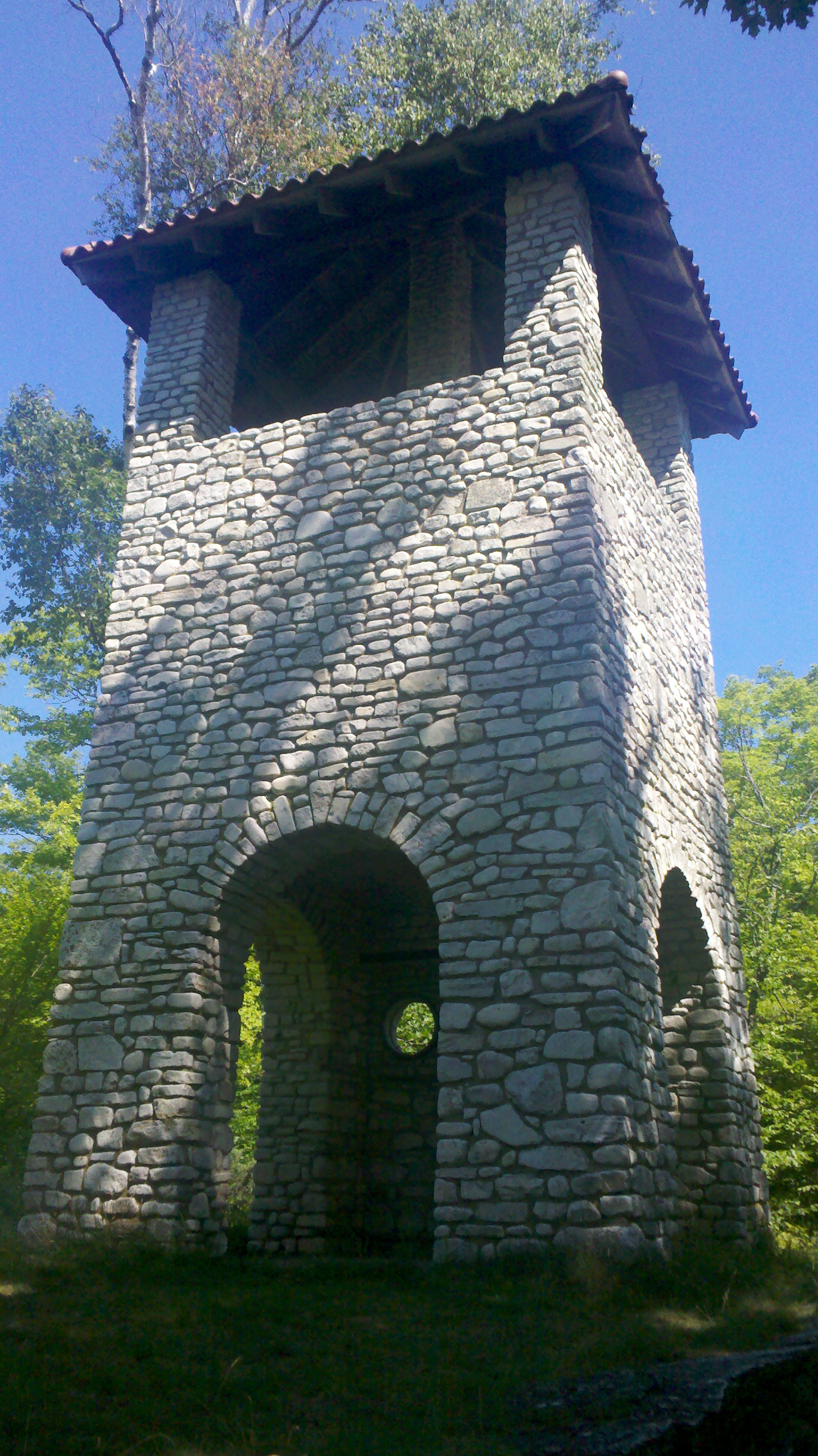
- Water Tower
- Location: Rock Island, town of Washington, Wisconsin
- Coordinates: 45°24′44″N 86°48′23″W
- Area: less than one acre
- Built: 1929
- MPS: Thordarson Estate Historic District
- NRHP reference No.: 85000640
- Added to NRHP: March 21, 1985

The Water Tower is located in Rock Island State Park on Rock Island in the town of Washington, Wisconsin.

== History ==
The water tower was once the property of Icelandic inventor Chester Thordarson. It is located in what is now known as the Thordarson Estate Historic District.
