= Rocky Island =

Rocky Island may refer to:

Australia

- Rocky Island (Queensland), in Walsh Bay, Queensland, Australia
- Rocky Point Island (Queensland), in Walsh Bay, Queensland, Australia

South China Sea

- Rocky Island, South China Sea, one of the Paracel Islands in the South China Sea (under the administration of the People's Republic of China. Vietnam also claims sovereignty)

Egypt

- Rocky Island (Egypt), in Foul Bay on the Egyptian coast of the Red Sea

Ireland

- Rocky Island (Cork), in Cork Harbour, County Cork, Republic of Ireland
- Rocky Island, County Fermanagh, a townland in County Fermanagh, Northern Ireland

Tuvalu

- Rocky Island, a former name of Niulakita

United States

- Rocky Island, a former name of Brooks Island in Richmond, California, in the San Francisco Bay
- Rocky Island (Wisconsin), one of the Apostle Islands in Lake Superior
- Rocky Island (Michigan), in Lake Michigan south of the Garden Peninsula

== See also ==
- Rock Island (disambiguation)
