= Rock Island Trail =

Rock Island Trail may refer to:

== Parks ==
- Rock Island Trail (Colorado), see Limon Railroad Depot

Rock Island Trail State Park

- Rock Island Trail State Park (Illinois), Illinois
- Rock Island Trail State Park (Missouri), Missouri

== Other uses ==
- Rock Island Trail (film), a 1950 American Western film

== See also ==
- Rock Island State Park (disambiguation)
- Rock Island (disambiguation)
