= Pottawatomie Light =

Lighthouse in Wisconsin, United States

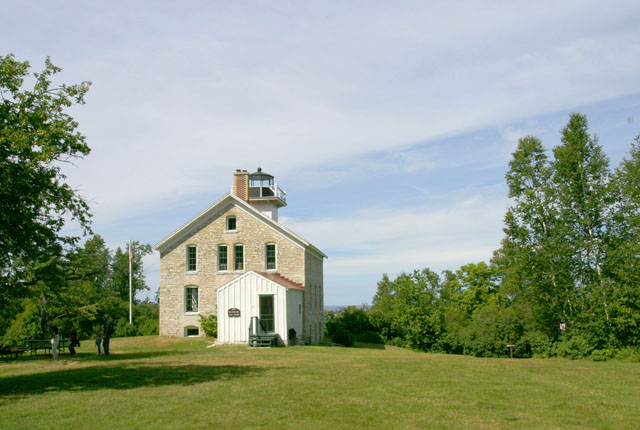
- Potawatomi Lighthouse 2004
- Location: Rock Island, Door County, Wisconsin
- Coordinates: 45°25′39″N 86°49′41″W

Tower
- Constructed: 1836
- Foundation: Stone
- Construction: Limestone
- Automated: 1966
- Height: 41 feet (12 m)
- Shape: Square, integral with keeper house
- Markings: natural with black lantern
- Heritage: National Register of Historic Places listed place

Light
- First lit: 1836
- Deactivated: 1988
- Focal height: 159 feet (48 m)
- Lens: Fresnel lens
- Range: 7 nautical miles (13 km; 8.1 mi)
- Characteristic: Fl W 4s 159 Light is obscured from 275° to 020° by dense foliage
- Pottawatomie Lighthouse
- U.S. National Register of Historic Places
- Nearest city: Washington Island, Wisconsin
- Area: 2 acres (0.81 ha)
- NRHP reference No.: 79000074
- Added to NRHP: April 20, 1979

Pottawatomie Lighthouse, also known as the Rock Island Light, is a lighthouse in Rock Island State Park, on Rock Island in Door County, Wisconsin. Lit in 1836, it is the oldest light station in Wisconsin and on Lake Michigan. It was served by civilian light keepers from 1836 to 1946, at which point it was automated.

== History ==
The first lighthouse on the spot was a 1.5-story house and 30-foot (9.1 m) detached tower built in 1836. Due to poor construction, it was replaced by the existing lighthouse in 1858. The original tower and dwelling were demolished in subsequent years. The current building was first lit in 1858 and continued as an active aid to navigation until 1988, when it was replaced with a modern skeletal tower and automated system.

It is the oldest light station in Door County, which has the most lighthouses of any Wisconsin county.

The lighthouse was restored by the Friends of Rock Island Lighthouse. It is open for tours during the summer as the Pottawatomie Lighthouse Museum. The lighthouse has been restored to a state illustrating its appearance circa 1909–1913. The restoration was completed in 2004 with the help from the non-profit Friends Of Rock Island State Park. It now serves as a museum that is open for tours daily from Memorial Day to Columbus Day 10am to 4pm.

The lighthouse was listed as Pottawatomie Lighthouse in the National Register of Historic Places in 1979, as reference #79000074. The fresnel lens, lost after the lighthouse was shut down in the late 1980s, was replaced by a plexiglass copy in 1999.

The original (1836) privy still stands on the grounds and is the oldest structure in Door County.

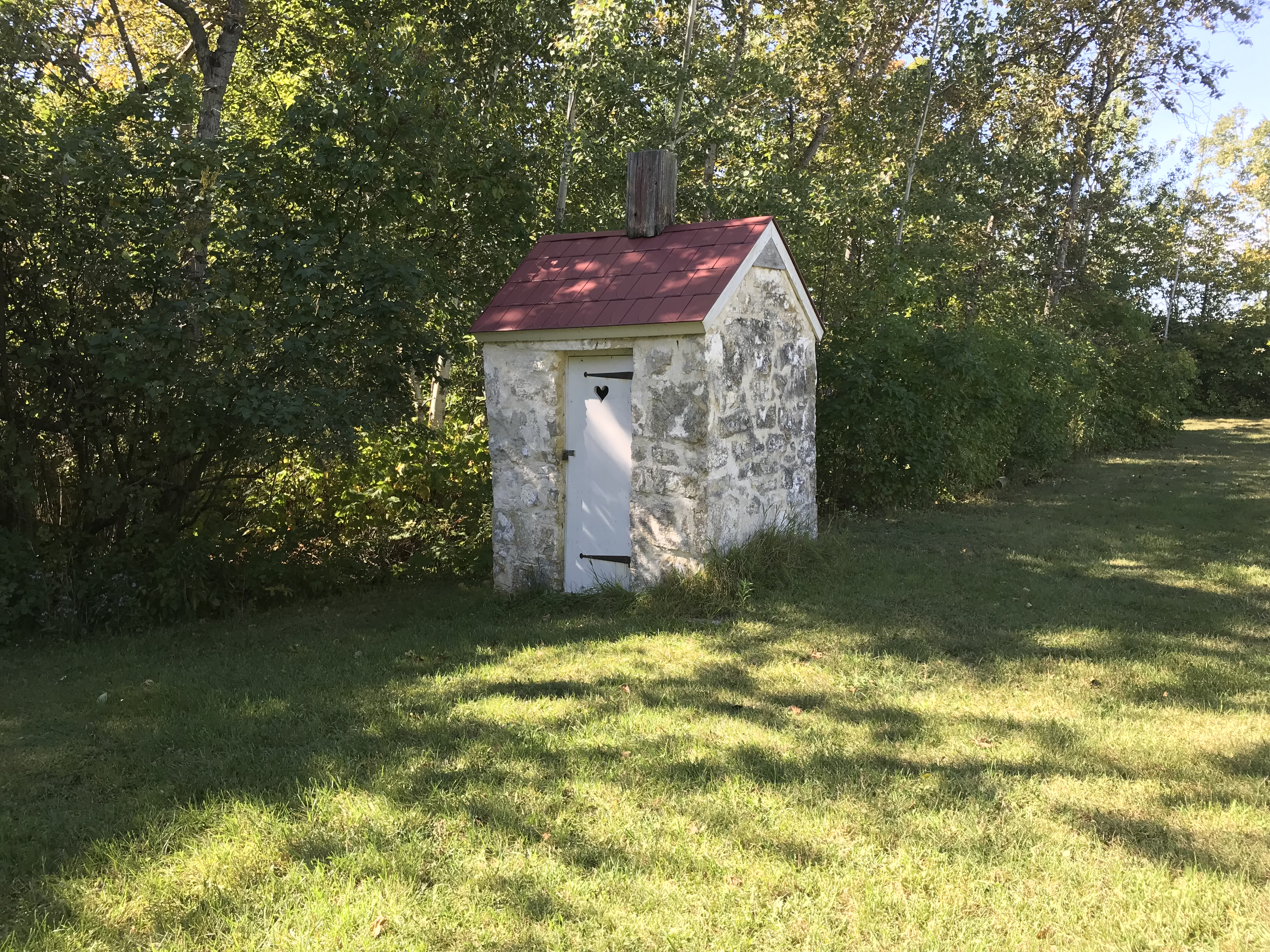
Oldest structure in Door County

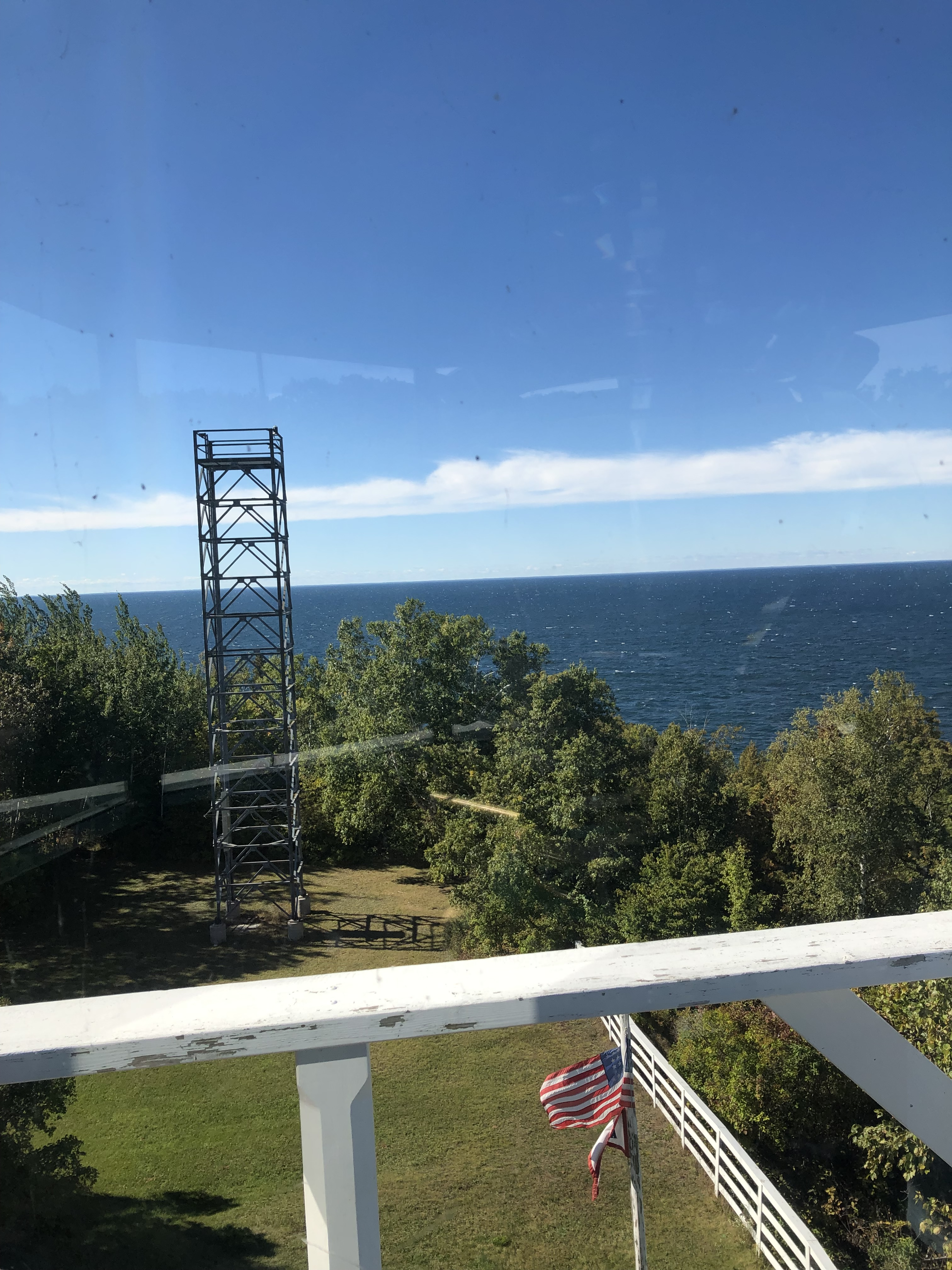
1986 Pottawatomie Light from light tower of 1858 structure

== Design ==
The current lighthouse is built in the schoolhouse style, with its tower integrated into the house structure. This was a common design used by many of the lighthouses built in the late 1850s/early 1860s, which saw a large increase in the number of lighthouses built on Lake Michigan. (See Port Washington Light, Grand Traverse Light, Pilot Island Light). Unlike most other lighthouses of the period, which were commonly built with brick, it was built out of local limestone. The lighthouse sits on a bluff 137 feet high, giving a focal height of 159 feet for its original fourth-order fresnel lens. The original light tower, including the lens, was removed after automation, and both the current lens and light platform are reconstructions.

The lighthouse is currently configured with a kitchen, sitting room, and one bedroom on the first floor, three bedrooms on the second floor, and a keeper's office on the partial third floor with the access to the light platform above. Some original artifacts, including the original wood stove, have been preserved, and the remainder of the house has been furnished with period appropriate furnishings, including a collection of antique quilts.

The lighthouse did have a telephone connection to the mainland installed in 1903, but never had electricity or running water. When the light was electrified and automated in 1947, it ran off of batteries, which had to be replaced by the Coast Guard periodically. The current light, which is on a steel tower just south of the original lighthouse, is solar powered.

A summer kitchen was added to the rear of the building sometime after 1883. Unlike the rest of the lighthouse, it was not restored to period, and instead functions as a gift shop and beginning/end point for tours.

== Keepers ==
For most of its history, the lighthouse was maintained by civilian keepers with the US Lighthouse Service. The lighthouse was staffed with one head keeper, and had an assistant keeper from 1866-1882 and again from 1901-1944.

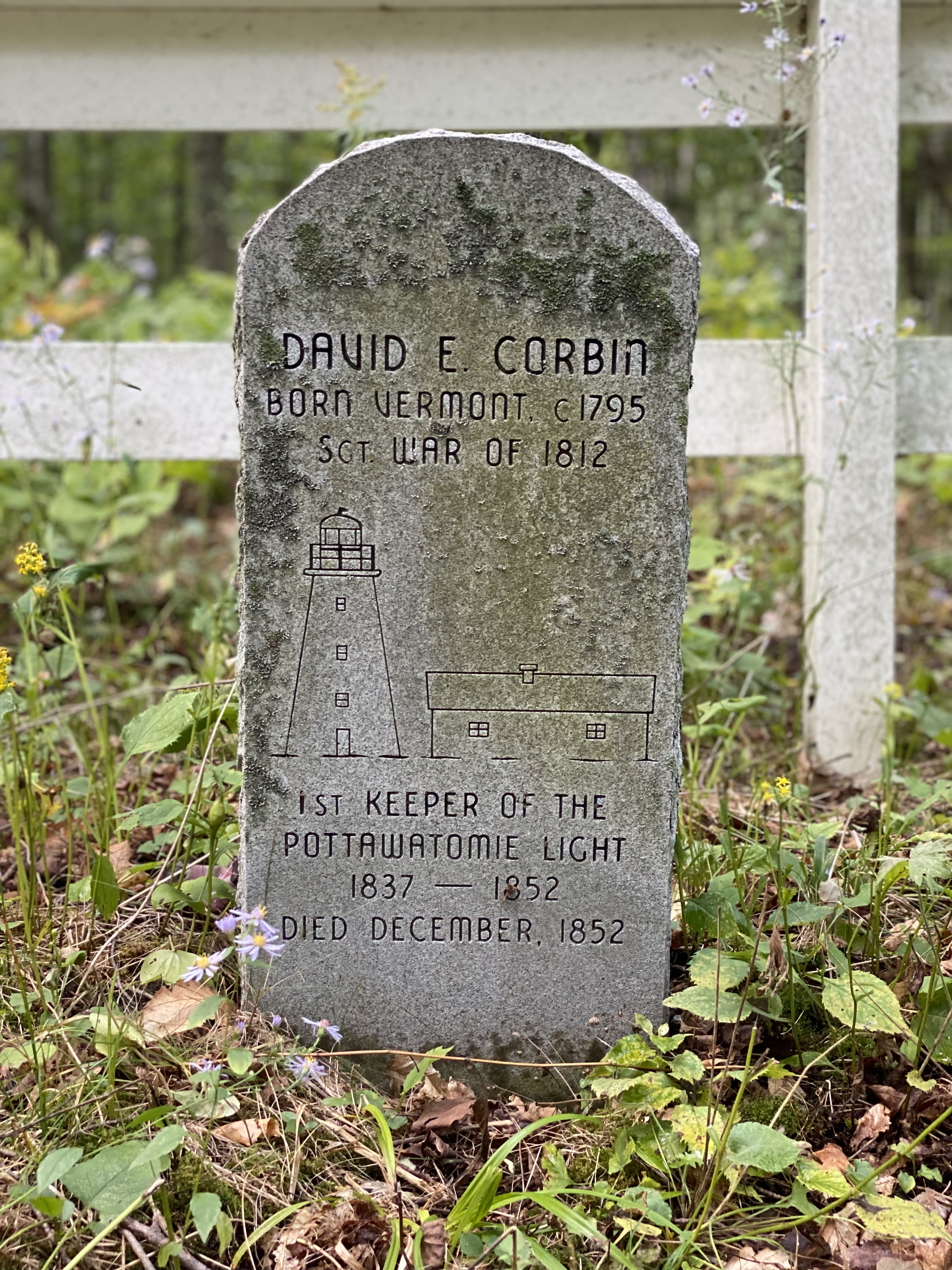
Grave of David Corbin, first keeper of Pottawatomie Light

== Museum Operation ==
When open for tours (Memorial Day weekend to Columbus Day), the lighthouse is staffed by volunteer docents provided by the Friends of Rock Island. These volunteers stay in the lighthouse for one week at a time, giving tours during operating hours.

== Gallery ==
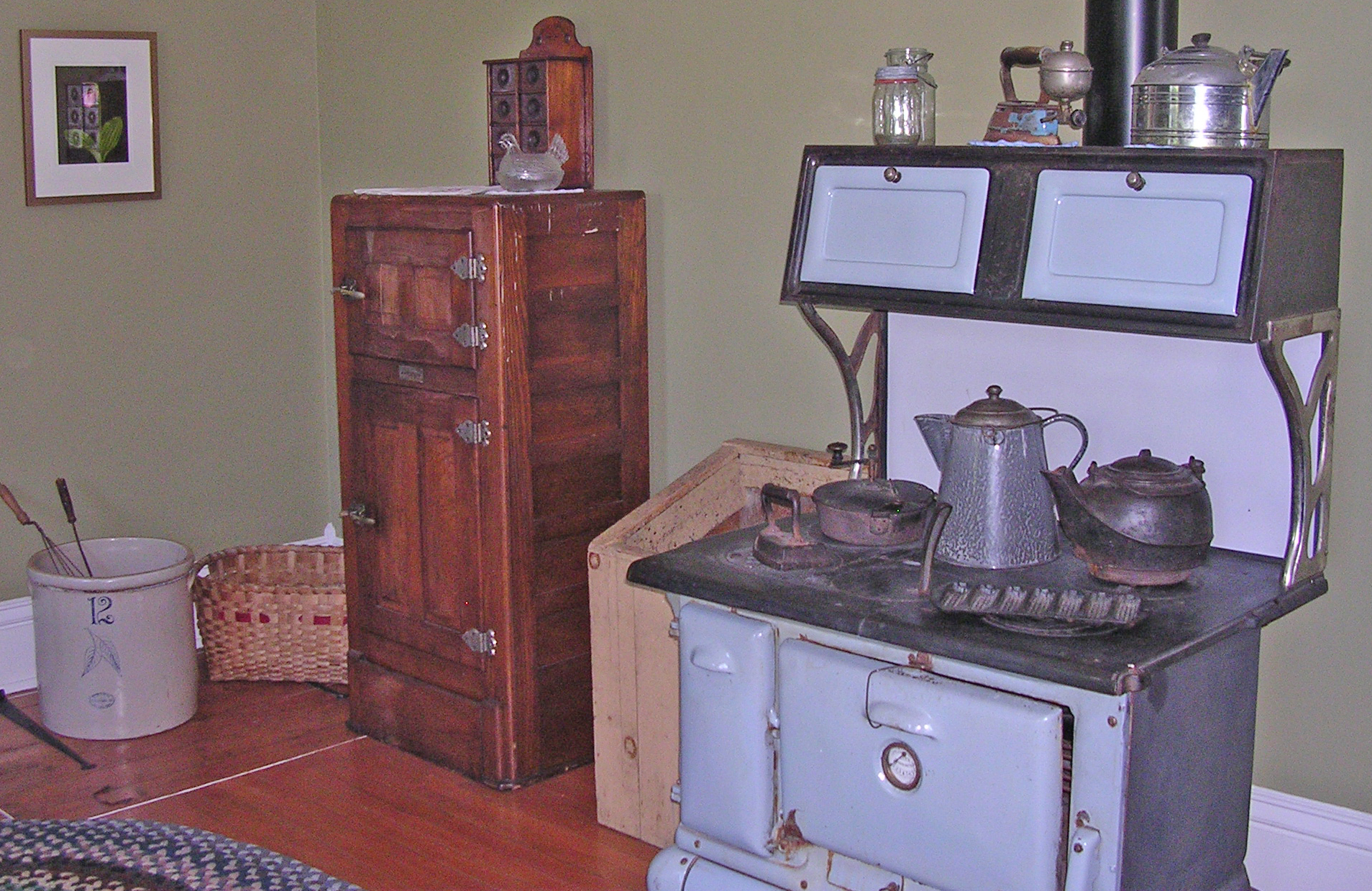
The interior has been historically restored.

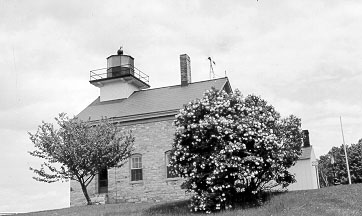
USCG archive photo

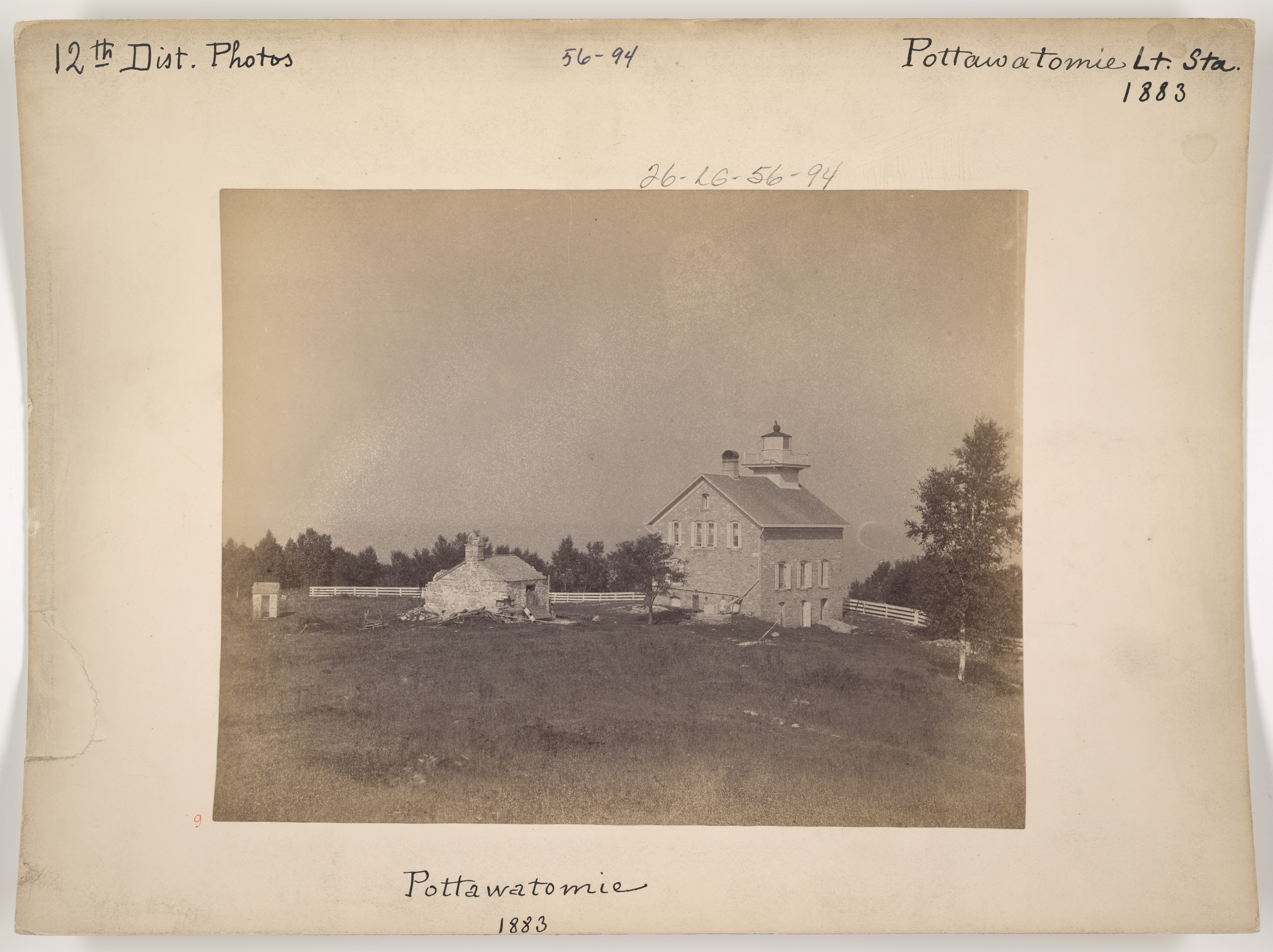
In 1883
