= Rock Township =

Rock Township may refer to:

in the United States

- Rock Township, Cherokee County, Iowa
- Rock Township, Lyon County, Iowa
- Rock Township, Mitchell County, Iowa
- Rock Township, Sioux County, Iowa, in Sioux County, Iowa
- Rock Township, Woodbury County, Iowa
- Rock Township, Marshall County, Kansas
- Rock Township, Pipestone County, Minnesota
- Rock Township, Jefferson County, Missouri
- Rock Township, Benson County, North Dakota
- Rock Township, Grant County, North Dakota, in Grant County, North Dakota

== See also ==
- Rock Island Township (disambiguation)
- Township (disambiguation)
- Rock (disambiguation)
