= Thordarson Estate Historic District =

Historic district in Wisconsin, United States

- U.S. National Register of Historic Places
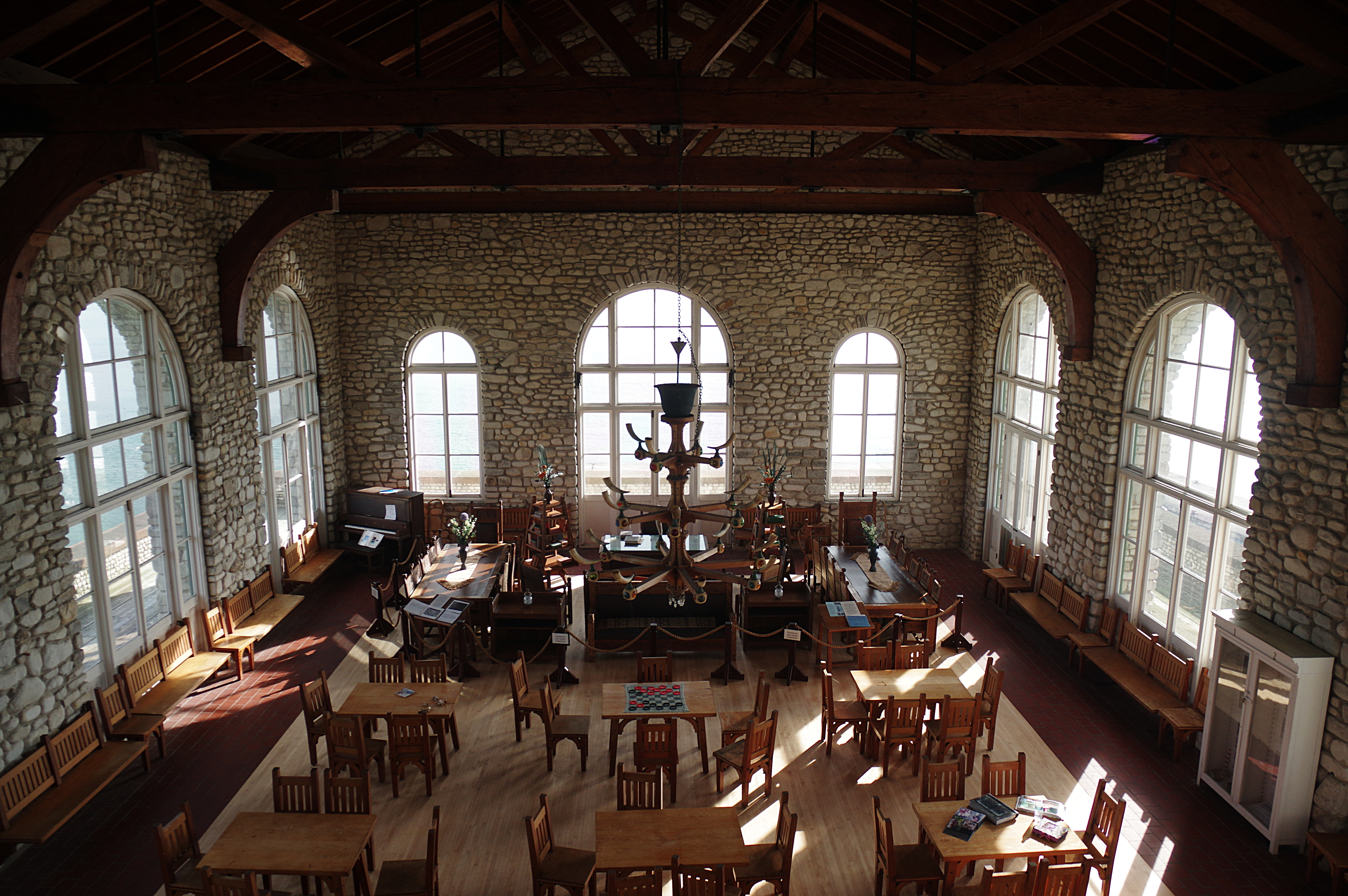
- Interior of the Rock Island boathouse
- Location: Rock Island, town of Washington, Wisconsin
- Area: 15 acres (6.1 ha)
- MPS: Thordarson Estate Historic District
- NRHP reference No.: 85000641
- Added to NRHP: March 21, 1985

The Thordarson Estate Historic District is located on Rock Island State Park on Rock Island in the town of Washington, Wisconsin.

== History ==
The district is made up of the estate of Icelandic inventor Chester Thordarson. A number of the buildings were designed by Frederick Dinkelberg. The district was listed on the National Register of Historic Places in 1985 and on the State Register of Historic Places in 1989.

Thordarson's noted water tower is located within the district.
