= Rock Island 886 =

Chicago, Rock Island & Pacific 886
Type and origin
- Power type: Steam
- Builder: American Locomotive Company
- Build date: July 1910
Specifications
- Configuration
  - Whyte: 4-6-2
- Gauge: 4 ft 8 1/2 in (1,435 mm)
- Driver dia.: 73 in (1,854 mm)
- Adhesive weight: 148,000 lb (67.1 tonnes)
- Loco weight: 227,000 lb (103.0 tonnes)
- Tender weight: 150,000 lb (68,038.9 kilograms) (empty)
- Total weight: 377,000 lb (171.0 tonnes)
- Water cap.: 7,500 US gal (28,000 L; 6,200 imp gal)
- Firebox
  - Grate area: 44.80 sq ft (4.162 m^{2})
- Boiler pressure: 185 lbf/in^{2} (1.28 MPa)
- Cylinders: Two
- Cylinder size: 23 in × 28 in (580 mm × 710 mm)
Performance figures
- Tractive effort: 31,907 lbf (141.93 kN)
- Factor of adh.: 4.64
Career
- Operators: Chicago, Rock Island and Pacific Railway
- Class: P-31
- Disposition: Display

Chicago, Rock Island & Pacific 886 (previously known as Chicago, Rock Island & Pacific 887) is a 4-6-2 Pacific type steam locomotive built in 1910 by the American Locomotive Company for the Rock Island Railroad. It is located in Illinois.

== History ==
The locomotive's original number is 887. In the 1950s, the city of Peoria, Illinois, asked Rock Island Railroad to donate the original 886 engine for display, as it was the last steam locomotive to operate out of Peoria; however, it had already been scrapped. Instead, Rock Island offered to donate 887, which was repainted and given "886" number boards. The acquisition was assisted by Louis Neumiller, former president of Caterpillar Tractor Co.

The locomotive, now rebranded as Rock Island 886, resided in Lower Glen Oak Park from 1956. However, by the early 1960s, it was starting to deteriorate due to vandalism and lack of regular painting. 886 was declared an eyesore and destined to be sold for scrap, but a public campaign, beginning in fall 1962, called for the engine to be restored and relocated. An editorial in the Journal Star declared: "The Park Board with title in hand would be doing the kids – and some of us old fogies, too – a real favor by preserving this priceless piece of Peoria’s past.”

Rock Island 886 was moved to Rock Island engine house for repairs, assisted by a $6,000 funding drive by the Commission for the Perpetuation and Preservation of Old 886. The locomotive was then relocated to the Detweiller Golf Course parking lot, opposite Detweiller Park. It remained there until April 1985, when it was acquired by the Wheels O' Time Museum in Dunlap, Illinois. Over one day, the locomotive was transported to the museum, a 7.2 mile (11.6 km) uphill journey through Detweiller Park.

In 2009, close to its 100th anniversary, Rock Island 886 was sanded, washed, repainted, and fitted with an electronic train whistle. As of 2018, the locomotive can still be seen on display at the Wheels O' Time Museum.
