= Rock Island (Rhode Island) =

Island in Kent County, Rhode Island, United States

Coordinates: 41°44′59″N 71°22′50″W

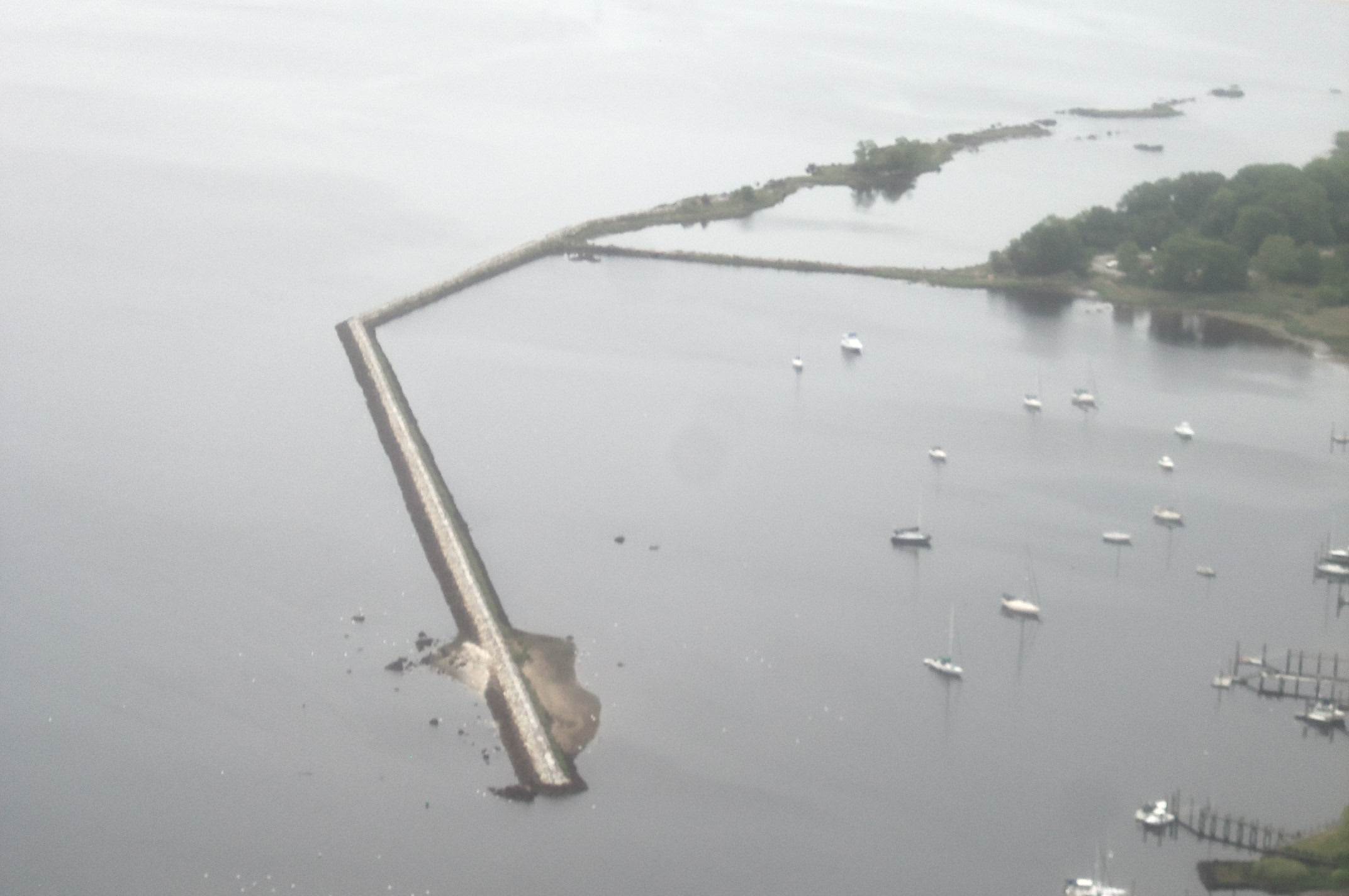
Salter Grove Memorial Park breakwater, with Rock Island at the far end

Rock Island is an island in Narragansett Bay in the U.S. state of Rhode Island.

Rock Island is a small rocky island near Pawtuxet Village and is now connected to the mainland by a causeway. The island is part of the Salter Grove public picnic ground and is the site for a proposed man-made salt marsh using dredged materials. The island contains several unusual fossils.
