= Rock Island (Wisconsin) =

Island in Wisconsin, United States

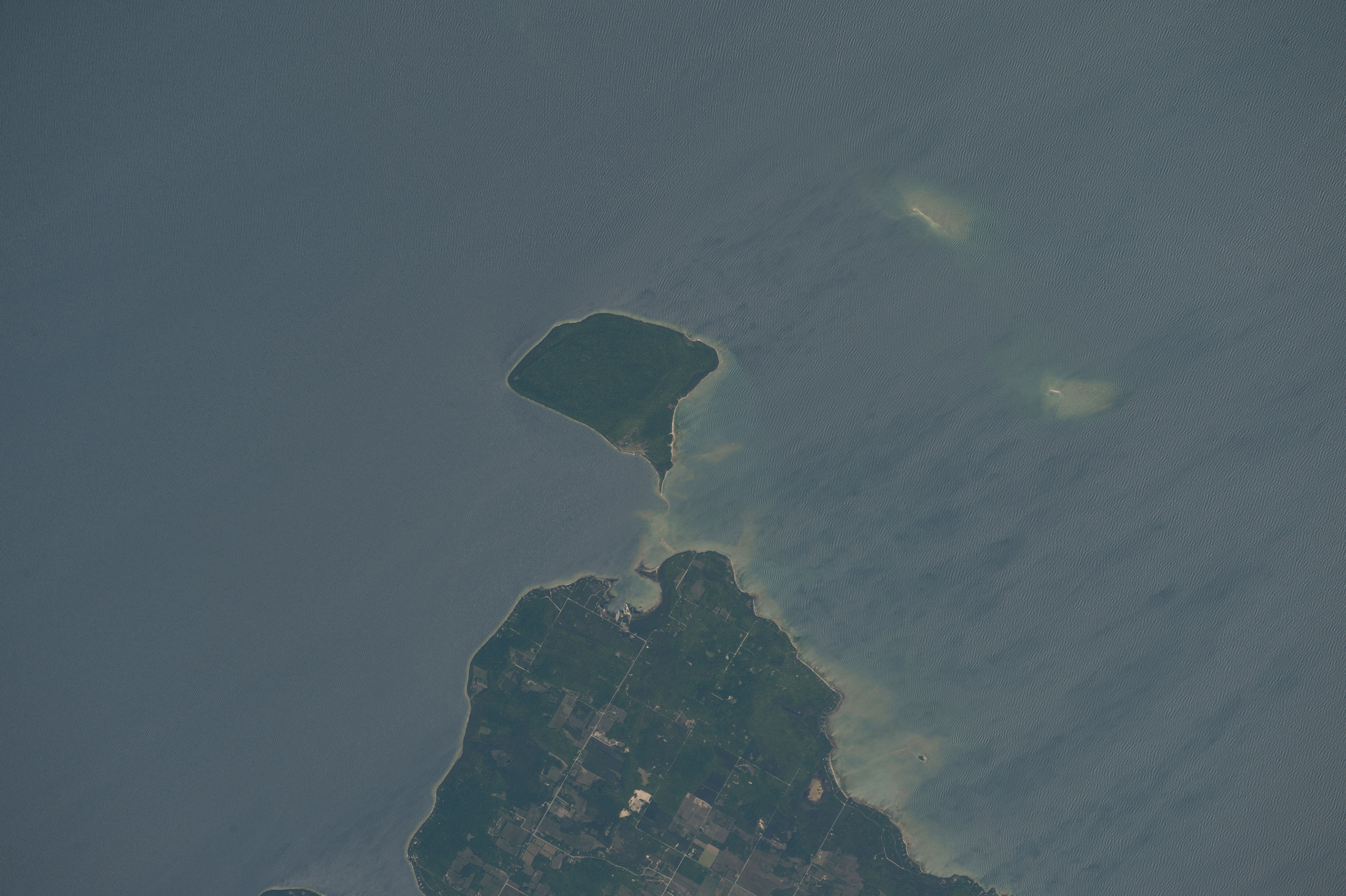
- Rock Island (above and to the center) on June 20, 2016, taken from the International Space Station. The photograph is oriented so north points towards the upper left.

- Location within Wisconsin Location within the United States

Geography
- Location: Green Bay, Wisconsin
- Coordinates: 45°24′55″N 86°49′15″W
- Area: 974.87 acres (394.52 ha)
- Length: 1.6 mi (2.6 km)
- Width: 1.1 mi (1.8 km)
- Highest elevation: 702 ft (214 m)

Administration
- United States
- State: Wisconsin
- County: Door County
- Town: Washington Island

Demographics
- Population: Uninhabited

Rock Island is a mostly wooded island off the tip of Wisconsin's Door Peninsula at the mouth of Green Bay, in Door County, Wisconsin. The 974.87-acre (394.5 ha) island is approximately 1.6 miles (2.6 km) long and 1.1 miles (1.8 km) wide. It rises to 65 meters above Lake Michigan, making it the highest in elevation out of all the Potawatomi Islands. It is almost entirely owned by the Wisconsin Department of Natural Resources, which maintains Rock Island State Park. It is the northernmost part of the town of Washington.

== History ==
Rock Island was originally settled by Native Americans. European explorers and missionaries used it as one of several stops along the Grand Traverse route between the Upper Peninsula of Michigan and Wisconsin.

The island became a navigational landmark in 1836 following the construction of the Potawatomi Lighthouse on the northern tip.

The first settlers of European descent on the island included John A. Boone, James McNeil, George Lovejoy, David E. Corbin, Jack Arnold, and Louis Lebue. All were fishermen and trappers from St. Helena Island in what is now the state of Michigan. They came from 1835–1836.

Boone was able to speak Chippewa and was considered the leader. McNeil was the first taxpayer in the county, and owned the entire south shore of the island. He was murdered, but by whom is unknown. After he died, other settlers searched for his stockpile of gold coins, but they were never found. Corbin kept the lighthouse on the island. Arnold was his friend and also lived in the lighthouse.

Louis Lebue, after the death of his wife on the island, left for Chicago where his constant talking about the wonders of Rock Island influenced several families from Lemont, Illinois in the Chicago area to move to Rock Island. This group, known as the Illinois colony, increased until nearly fifty families lived at the "old settlement" area on the east shore where they shared the island with an almost equal number of Potawatomi families. Perry Graham and Robert Graham later left the Illinois colony and founded Sturgeon Bay.

Fishing supported this early colony and the first government for the Town of Washington was formed there on June 20, 1850. By 1863, Rock Island had its first school, but already the exodus from the island had begun as settlers moved to other parts of Door County. The lack of good harbors and the inconveniences resulting from the isolation hastened the move. By 1875 the island was all but deserted until Chester Thordarson's activities. Grave markers of some of the original settlers still remain on the north shore of the island.

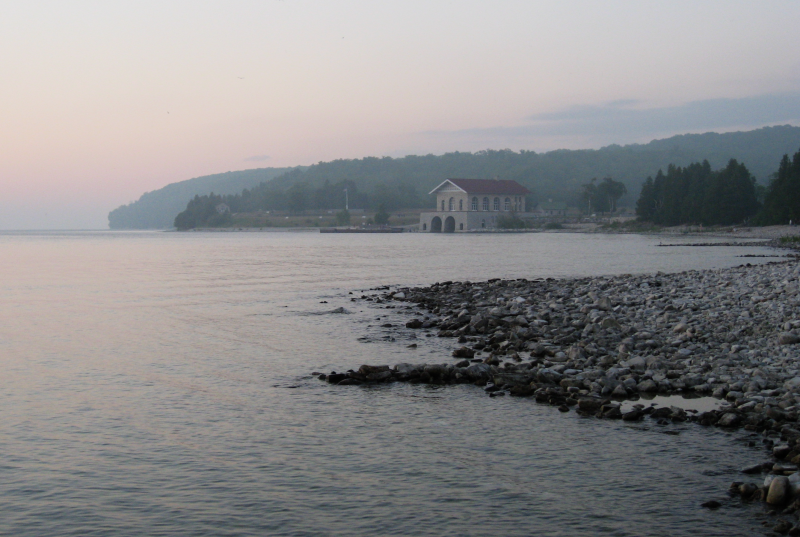
Rock Island, Chester Thordarson's boathouse and ferry pier.

In 1910 wealthy inventor Chester Thordarson purchased 775 acres (314 ha) of the island. 30 acres (12 ha) on the southwest side of the island were cleared in 1920 and Thordarson began construction of a summer estate, now known as the Thordarson Estate Historic District. His large boathouse, which is decorated with characters from the Norse Runic alphabet, is open to the public. The district also includes Thordarson's water tower.

The border between Wisconsin and Michigan was originally defined as "the most usual ship channel" into Green Bay from Lake Michigan. Since different commercial routes passed between different islands, there was a dispute about where the border was. In 1936, the U.S. Supreme Court decision Wisconsin v. Michigan found that Rock and other nearby islands were part of Wisconsin.

The Wisconsin DNR purchased the island and buildings from Thordarson's heirs in 1965. Today the only other landholder on the island is the US Coast Guard, which maintains an automated navigation light near the old lighthouse.

== Lighthouse ==
The Pottawatomie Lighthouse was one of several the government had constructed at the time, and the woodworking around the door frames and windows are from these plans. The main structure is two stories, four including the basement and lantern room. The main two floors have walls of foot-thick limestone, while the lantern room is surrounded only by wood. The lighthouse also includes a summer kitchen, which the lighthouse keepers would use during the warmer months. This room is currently used as a gift shop and makeshift kitchen.

The lighthouse has been restored to its 1910 condition by the Friends of Rock Island State Park including obtaining a replica of the Fresnel lens used in the original light. In the summer, volunteer docents give tours, staying for a week at a time. There is no running water or electricity in the lighthouse, but one room is heated.

== Carvings ==
On Rock Island, there are carvings which were made by workers who helped build the Thordarson buildings. These carvings can still be seen today.

== Plant life ==
Rock Island has flowers such as Trillium, Jack in the pulpit, and lady's slipper in abundance, as well as other plants, such as cow parsnip, Indian paintbrush, and poison ivy. The non-native Icelandic thyme was planted on the island by Thordarson.

== Transportation ==
Rock Island can be reached via a passenger ferry named the Karfi from Washington Island. No vehicles, including bicycles, are permitted on the island.

== Gallery ==
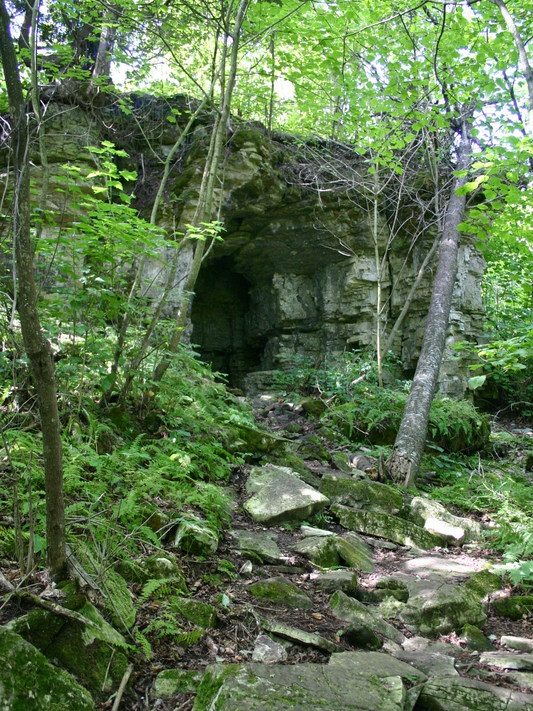
Sea cave

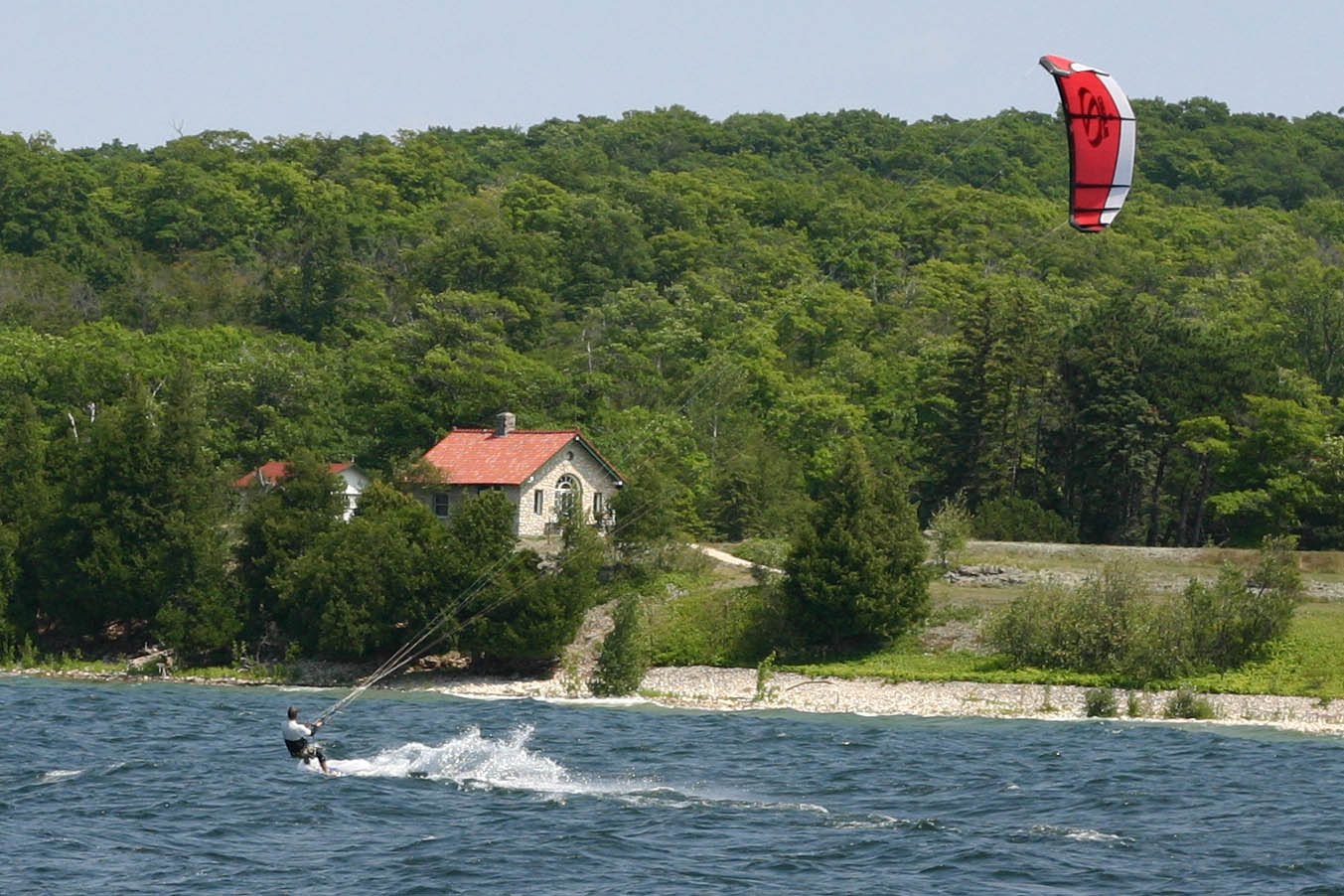
Kitesurfer

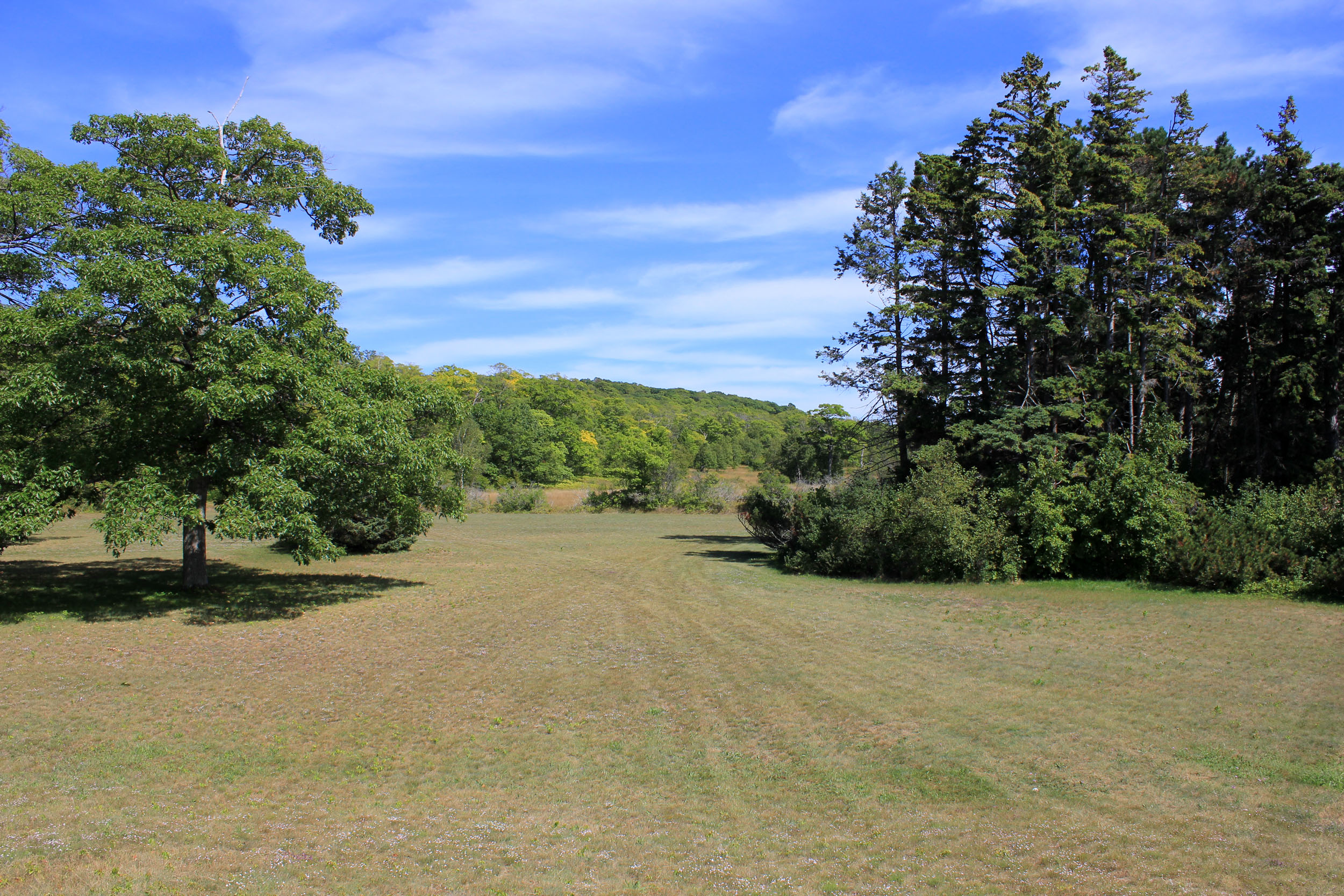
Landscape

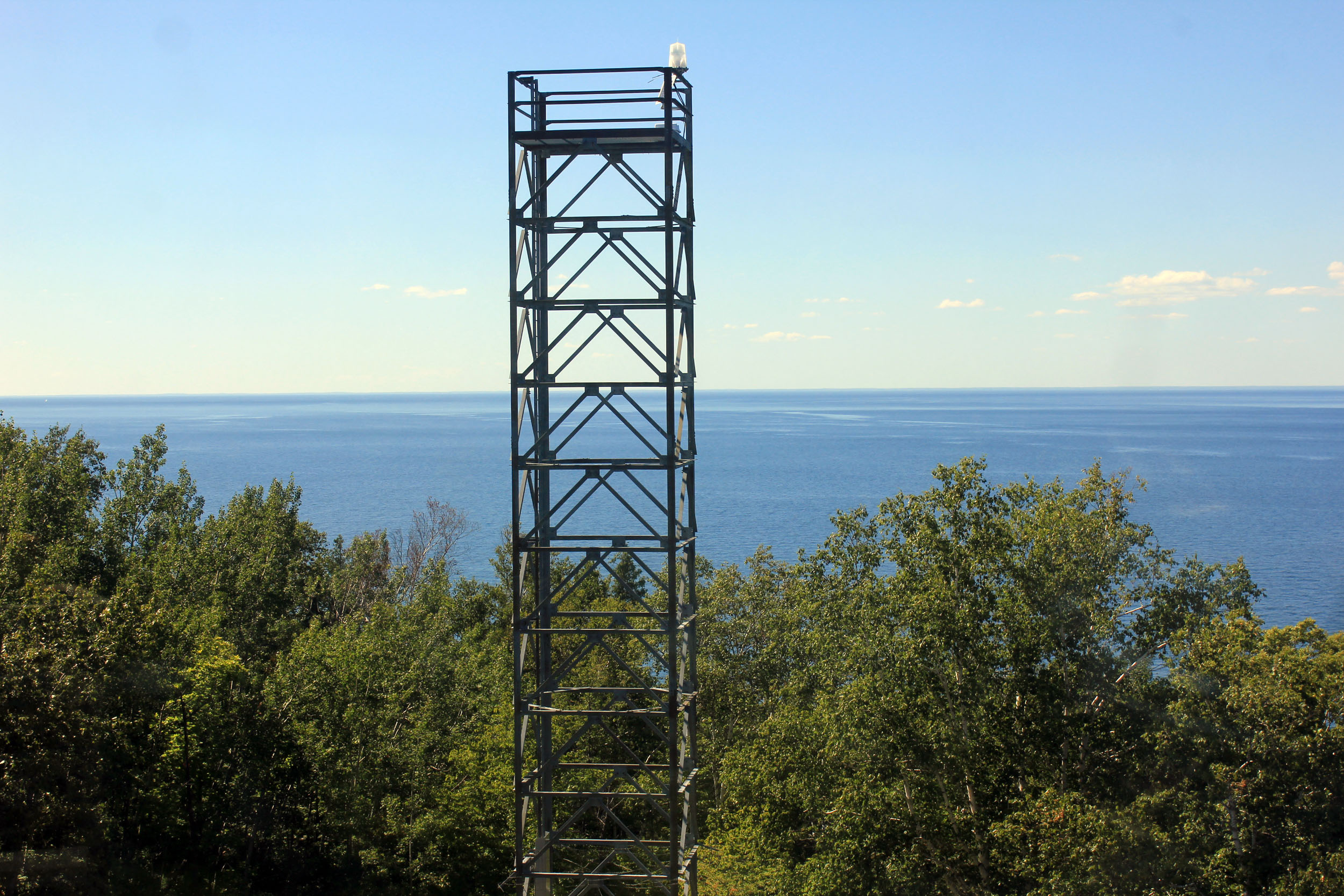
Navigation light

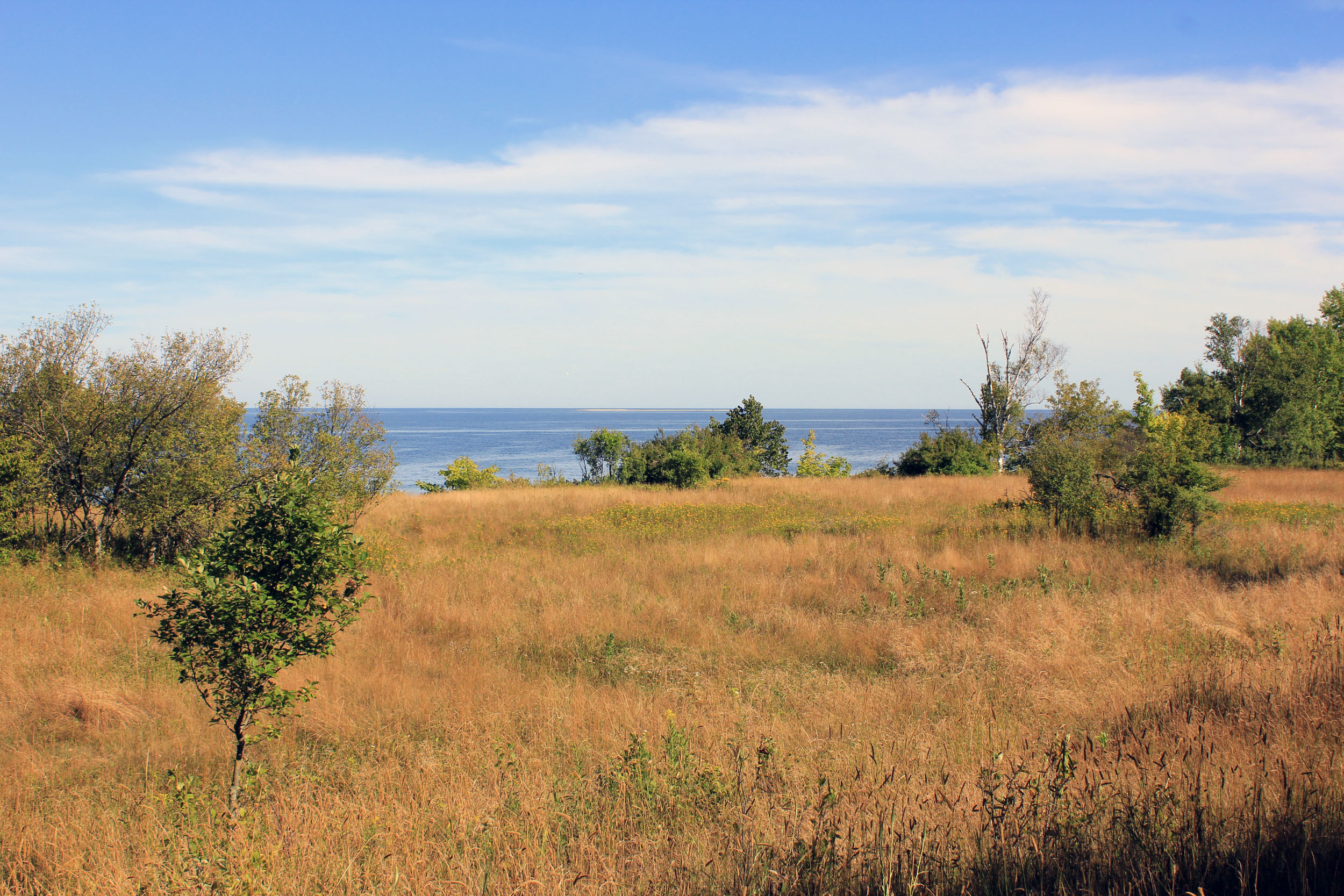
Landscape and lake
