= Island Line =

Island Line or Island line may refer to:

- Island line (MTR), one of the lines of the MTR metro system in Hong Kong
- Island Line, Isle of Wight, a railway line on the Isle of Wight, England
  - Island Line (brand), the brand under which the above line is operated
- Island Line Trail, a trail along a former railway line, located in the northwest of Vermont, United States
