= Rock Island Bridge (Kansas City, Kansas) =

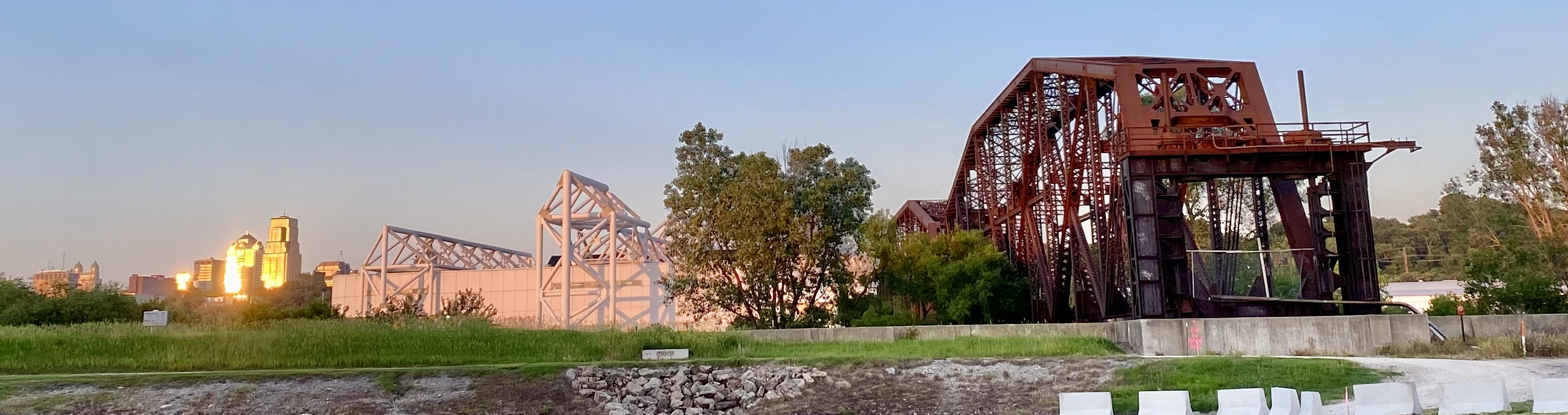
- Downtown Kansas City, Missouri is in the distant background on the bluff, and the Hy-Vee Arena and the Rock Island Bridge are above the levee.
- Coordinates: 39.0911°N 94.6087°W
- Carries: Historically one track of Chicago, Rock Island and Pacific Railroad
- Crosses: Kansas River
- Locale: Kansas City, Kansas connecting to Kansas City, Missouri border near West Bottoms
- Official name: Chicago, Rock Island and Pacific Railroad Bridge
- Maintained by: Unified Government (owner); Flying Truss LLC (operator/developer)

Characteristics
- Design: Pennsylvania through truss
- Material: Steel (riveted construction)
- Total length: 705 ft (215 m)

History
- Constructed by: American Bridge Company
- Opened: 1905
- Closed: c. 1970s (rail service ceased); 1980 (rail line liquidated)

Location
- Interactive map of Rock Island Bridge

The Rock Island Bridge is a historic railroad bridge crossing the Kansas River in Kansas City, Kansas. It connects the Armourdale neighborhood to the West Bottoms area near the Kansas-Missouri state line. The Chicago, Rock Island and Pacific Railroad (the Rock Island line) completed the steel Pennsylvania through truss bridge in 1905. Rail operations ceased in the 1970s, and the bridge was dormant for decades.

In 2022, the Unified Government (UG) of Wyandotte County and Kansas City, Kansas acquired ownership. Flying Truss, LLC, is a startup company that is redeveloping the structure into a public crossing, entertainment district, and event venue, described as "America's first trailhead and entertainment district over a river".

== History ==
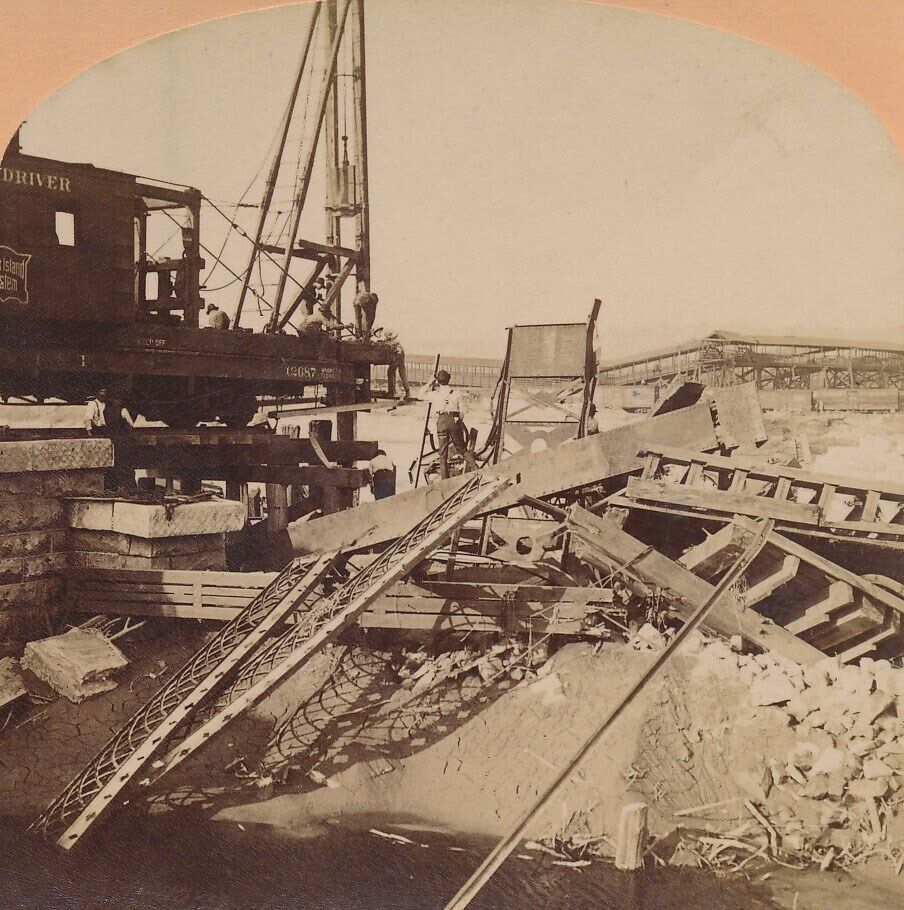
A wooden bridge was destroyed in the 1903 Kansas River flood, and was replaced by the Rock Island Bridge.

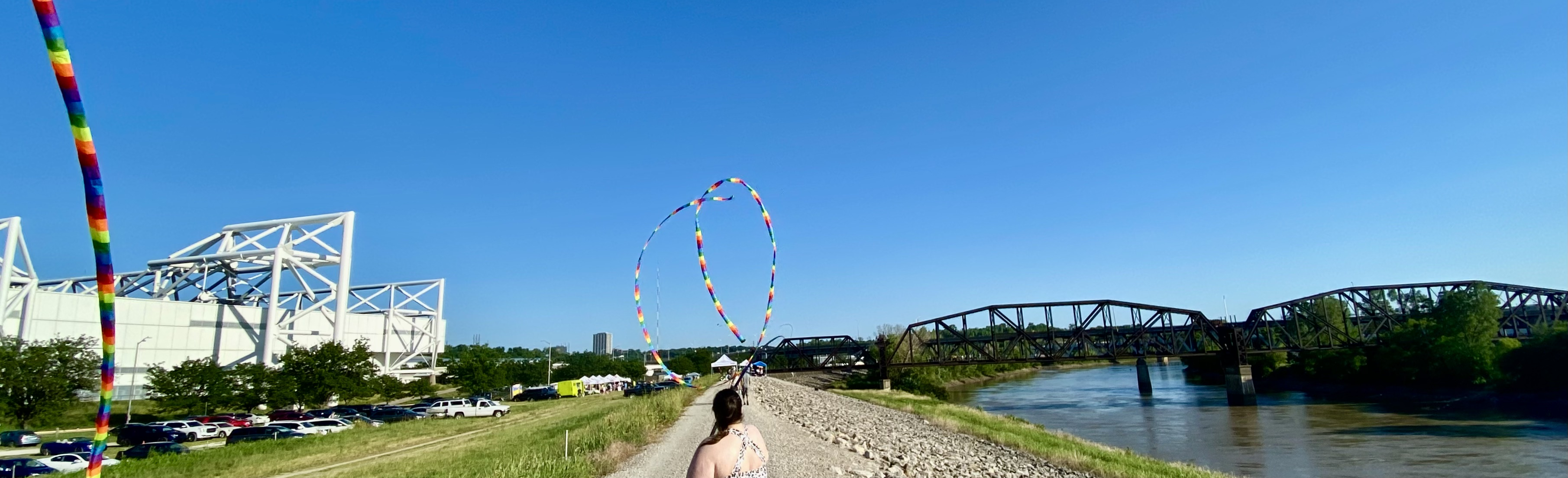
The Hy-Vee Arena faces the levee, and the Rock Island Bridge crosses the Kansas River.

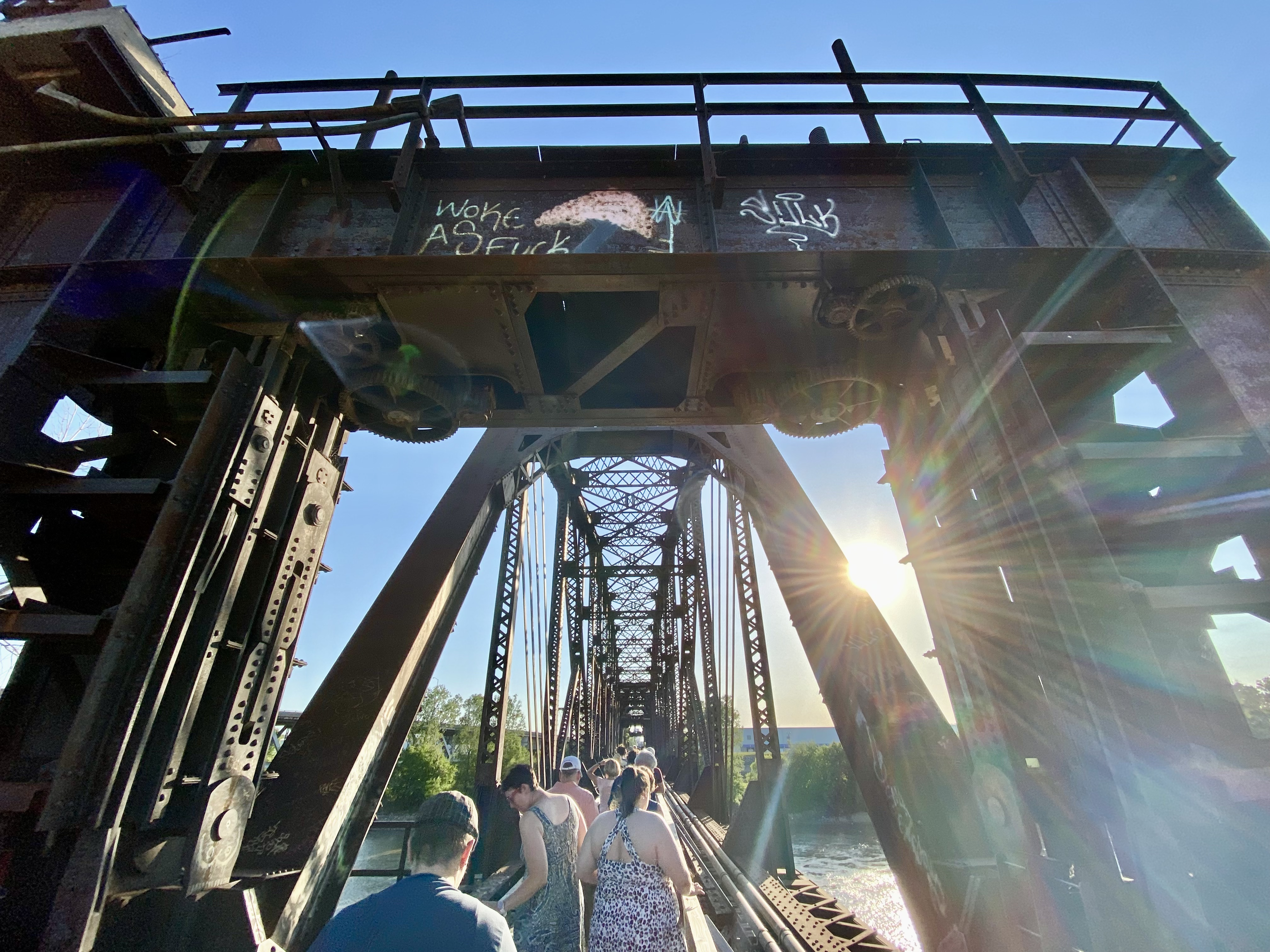
A public tour of Rock Island Bridge shows graffiti and rust before any redevelopment, within the Kaw Social in 2021. The design features chords, web members, gusset plates, and portal bracing.

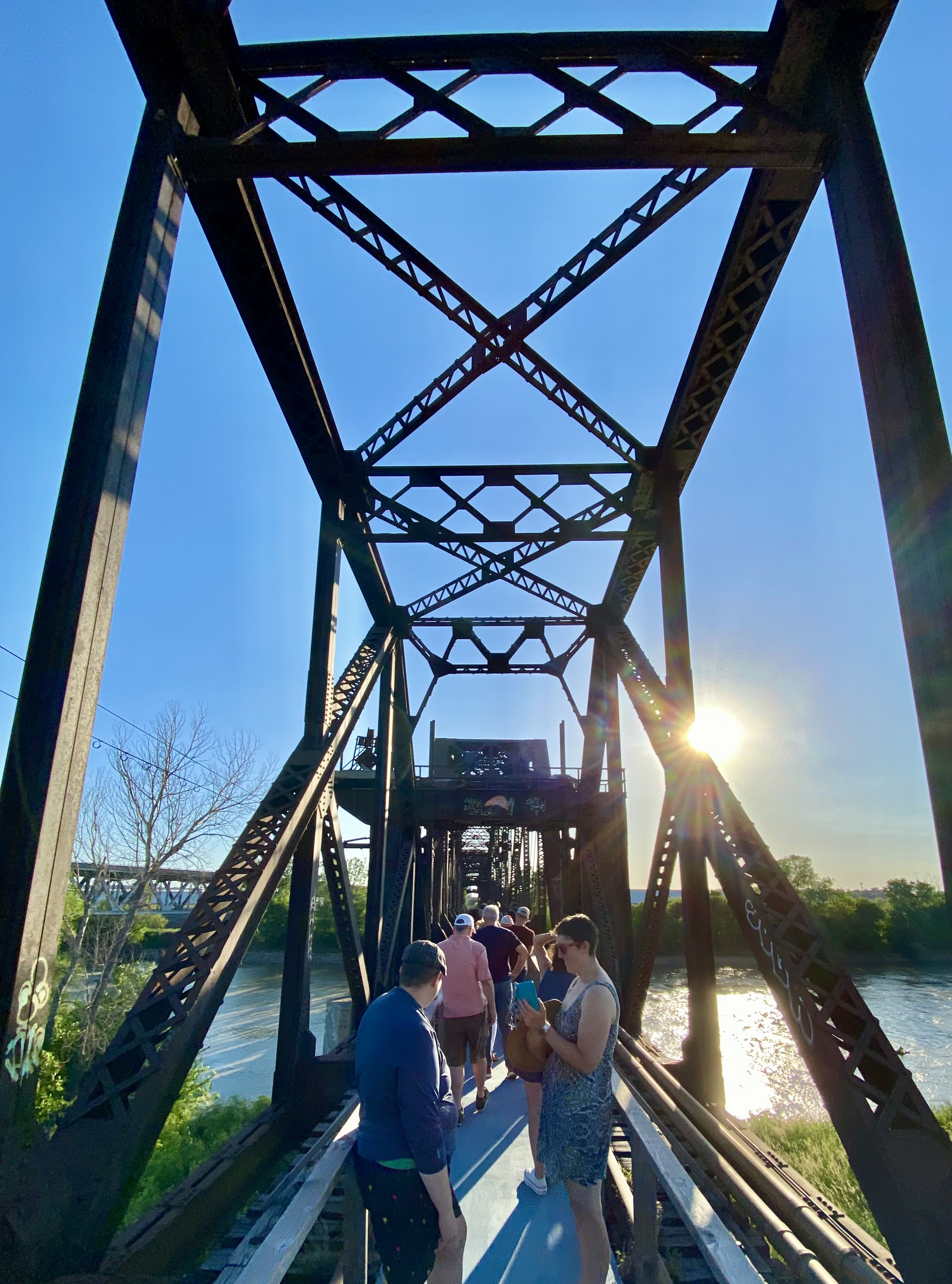
The public toured Rock Island Bridge in 2021.

The bridge site provided a vital rail connection for the Kansas City Stockyards across the Kansas River. The 1903 Kansas River flood destroyed the Rock Island line's previous wood-pile bridge at this location.

The Rock Island Railroad commissioned the American Bridge Company (formed in 1900 from a merger of 28 companies and part of U.S. Steel from 1901) to build the replacement structure. It opened in 1905 at an approximate cost of US$170,000 (equivalent to about $6,000,000 in 2025). The design deployed two 302-foot (92 m) Pennsylvania-style truss spans, each at 350 short tons (320 t), using riveted Carnegie steel, and set on concrete foundations sunk 40 feet (12 m) into the riverbed. In 1921, the United States Army Corps of Engineers widened the river channel, which required adding a third, shorter truss span on the east side. This established the bridge's 705 feet (215 m) length.

During the Great Flood of 1951, the river's water level reportedly reached the bottom of the bridge, which withstood the flood that devastated the stockyards and the rest of West Bottoms. Due to this widespread disaster, the Army Corps of Engineers hired construction firm L.G. Barcus and Sons in Kansas City, Kansas, to install a protective lifting system. It was completed around 1951–1952, using four screw-lift gates which allow the three truss spans to be raised by 6 feet (1.8 m) to clear floodwaters.

Rail service over the bridge declined with the stockyards and ceased around the 1970s. The Rock Island Railroad filed for bankruptcy in 1975 and was liquidated in 1980. The bridge was reportedly sold to the St. Louis Southwestern Railway. In 1987, the City of Kansas City, Missouri purchased the bridge and its access easements with the unrealized intention of using it as a pedestrian connection for Kemper Arena parking. The bridge then remained unused, as the Kansas City Stockyards held its final auction in 1991.

=== Redevelopment ===
A boat outing by "visionary" Michael Zeller and his wife, inspired him to rethink a bridge as being land, and to imagine a "steel park across a river". He joked that someone could install utilities and a restaurant called "Chicken on a Bridge". After his many failed attempts to persuade other entities to launch this project, he co-founded Flying Truss, LLC specifically to do it.

In 2017, a MARC Planning Sustainable Places study included engineering analysis and conceptual design. In 2022, the Unified Government (UG) of Wyandotte County and Kansas City, Kansas bought the bridge from the City of Kansas City, Missouri, for $1. This enabled redevelopment plans proposed by Flying Truss, LLC, which leased the bridge for development and operation under a long-term agreement reported as 33 years with a 33-year renewal option, totaling 66 years.

The redevelopment project cost was estimated at $15 million as of July 2024. Initial funding included $2.4 million allocated by the UG. Funding sources combine private investment, philanthropic contributions (including support from the Sunderland, Helzberg, and Dickinson Foundations, and a fund at the Greater Kansas City Community Foundation), and public funds, including a $4 million grant from the Kansas SPARK (Strengthening People and Revitalizing Kansas) program. Raising the bridge was necessary for parity with the surrounding modern levee system built by the Army Corps of Engineers for its 750-year plan for the areawide floodplain. Cost increases, including $500,000 for bridge strengthening requested by the UG, and $850,000 related to raising the bridge, were expected to be partially offset by revenue from a Community Improvement District (CID) created for the project, which would also repay the county's initial budget allocation.

In March 2023, Flying Truss hired L.G. Barcus and Sons, which had installed the original lift system after the Great Flood of 1951, as the general contractor for the structural modifications, which was conducted without marine operations. Major work included removing the old railroad ties and 1,400 feet (430 m) of rails (weighing over 50 short tons (45 t)), adding over 380 short tons (340 t) of new steel and nearly 700 short tons (640 t) of concrete, removing graffiti, and installing new utility lines for water, sewer, electrical, and gas. In June 2023, the project team raised the entire bridge structure by 3 ft 4 in (102 cm) to establish its permanent height 60 ft (18 m) above the river to conform to Army Corps of Engineers standards; this lift utilized the original 1950s gears and screw jacks, operated by new motors. To expand the usable space, steel cantilevers were added to widen the central truss span, creating a main deck 65 feet (20 m) wide and spanning approximately 11,000 sq ft (1,000 m^{2}). An upper event deck, measuring 265 feet (81 m) long by 47 feet (14 m) wide, was constructed above the main level, and new decking and railings were installed, with some salvaged rails incorporated as footrests.

The completed venue is planned to offer multiple kitchens, bars, coffee shops, public restrooms, and event spaces. The site deliberately connects to areawide public trailheads developed by the Unified Government along the Kansas River levees, part of the planned Kansas Waterfront park space intended to link the Armourdale and Argentine neighborhoods.

==== Reception ====
The project is part of the High Line Network, which recognizes significant infrastructure reuse projects and creates vibrant public spaces in North America. Midwest Contractor magazine called the Rock Island Bridge "a catalyst for revitalization of the area" for other hospitality and retail developers to build around.

== See also ==
- French Bottoms
- Strawberry Hill (Kansas City, Kansas)
- City workhouse castle
