= Rock Island State Park (Wisconsin) =

State park on Rock Island in Door County, Wisconsin

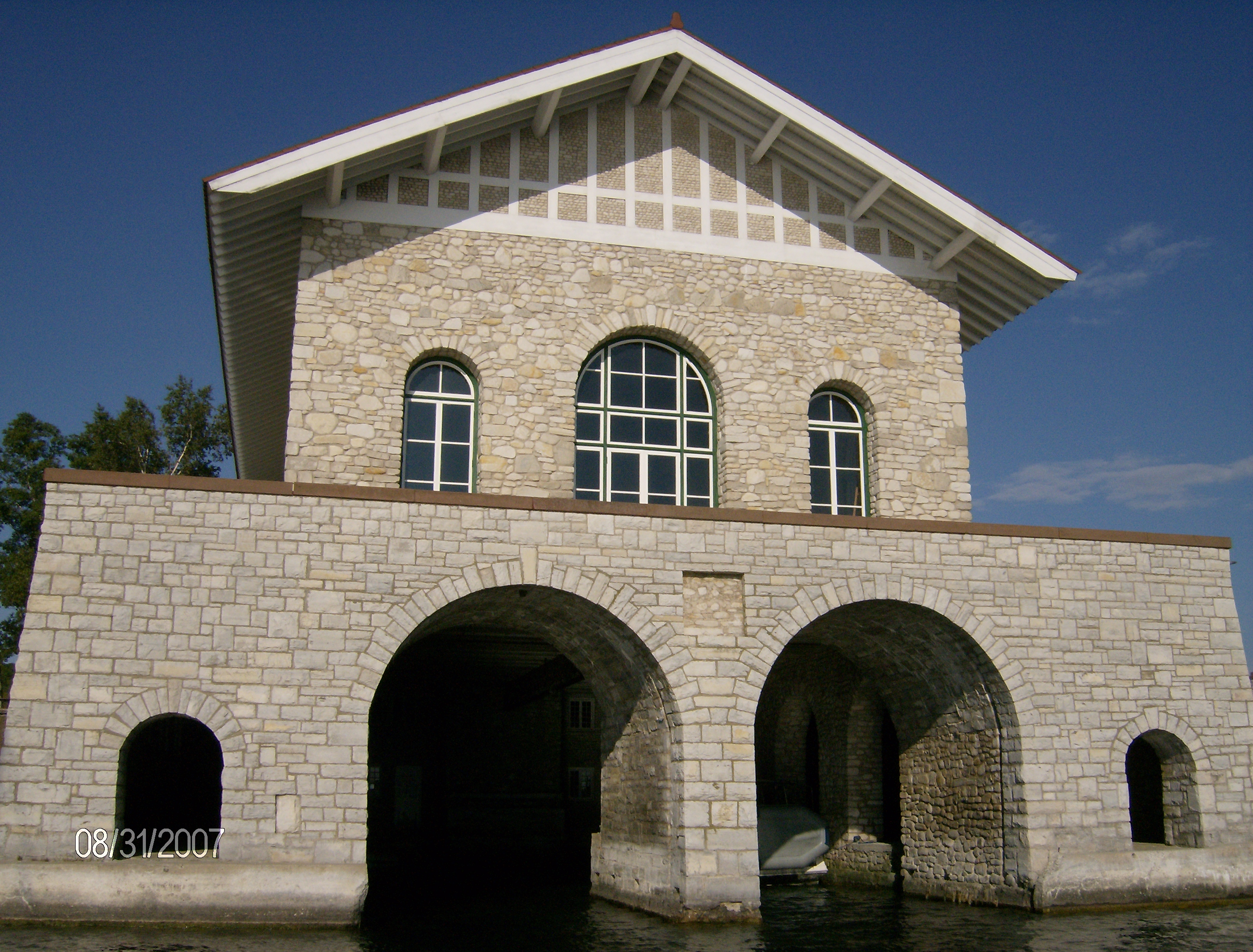
- Icelandic Boathouse in Rock Island State Park

- Location within Wisconsin Location within the United States
- Interactive map of Rock Island State Park
- Location: Door County, Wisconsin, United States
- Coordinates: 45°25′04″N 86°49′10″W
- Area: 912 acres (369 ha)
- Elevation: 702 ft (214 m)
- Established: 1965
- Administrator: Wisconsin Department of Natural Resources
- Authorized: by the county board on December 11, 1961
- Website: Official website
- Wisconsin State Parks

Rock Island State Park is a state park of Wisconsin located on Rock Island off the tip of the Door Peninsula at the eastern edge of Green Bay and Lake Michigan.

== History ==
Rock Island was proposed as a state park in early 1961 by officials of the Town of Washington Island, particularly Jack Hagen the town chairman. There was considerable excitement in the town over the economic benefits of having a state park nearby.

A feasibility study was made in September 1961 by the Wisconsin Department of Conservation. A group of people including Jack Hagen and other town officials, some county officials, and some state officials along with Lawrence Johnson walked around and flew over the island to consider it. The county board approved the acquisition on December 11, 1961.

In the spring of 1962, the Department of Conservation negotiated with Dewey Thordarson, who was administering the late Chester Thordarson's estate on behalf of himself and other heirs. On July 17, 1962 an agreement was reached. It stipulated that the state Conservation Department would exercise temporary custodial care of the property along with the option to purchase the land for a park in the future. It expired on August 31, 1963 and funds were not available to purchase it. In order to keep the land undeveloped for longer while waiting on the state legislature, a three-year scenic easement was purchased for $5,000 which counted towards the eventual purchase price. While waiting on the state legislature, the Department of Conservation obtained short extensions to the purchase option for the property.

After the state legislature voted, the property was purchased in April 1965. Park construction began in May 1965.

== Activities and amenities ==
Attractions include the stone Viking boathouse and other structures including a historic water tower built by inventor Chester H. Thordarson in what is now known as the Thordarson Estate Historic District, Native American artifacts, as well as Pottawatomie Light, which is Wisconsin's oldest lighthouse. The island is a destination in the fall for deer hunters and in the winter for snowmobilers from nearby Washington Island. The park has campsites available and is a destination for day trippers.

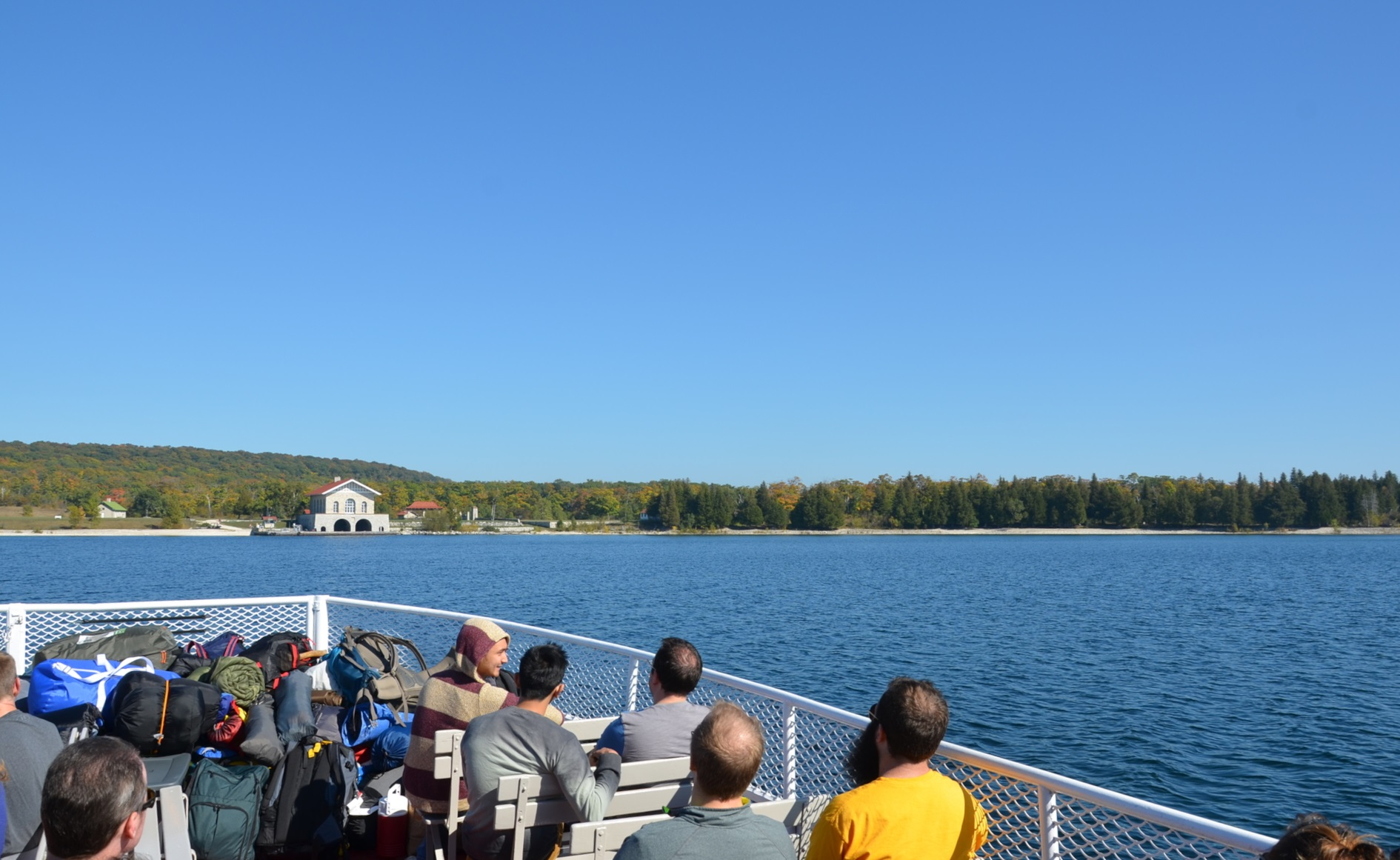
Karfi approaching Rock Island

=== Transportation ===
The only public transportation to the island is by the passenger ferry Karfi from Washington Island. However, there is mooring and dock space for people with their own boats, and during winter the island is accessible via snowmobile and foot traffic. No "wheeled vehicles" (cars, all-terrain vehicles, bicycles) are allowed to be brought onto the island by visitors, although park staff use them routinely.

== Climate ==
The climate of Rock Island is moderate with an annual mean temperature of 48 °F (9 °C). The average annual number of frost-free days is approximately 145 on nearby Washington Island, where basic climatic data is recorded for the region. Recorded temperatures range from a low of −30 °F (−34 °C) to a high of 114 °F (46 °C). The mean annual precipitation is approximately 28 inches, with an average winter snowfall totaling fifty inches. The immensity of the surrounding body of water generally insulates Rock Island and its neighbors from the extremes of summer heat and winter cold that is experienced in the interior parts of the country at this same latitude. Moderating effects of the waters also prolong cold weather in the spring and repress early frosts in the fall. The worst storms to hit Rock Island generally occur in the autumn and are driven by winds from the northwest.

On June 16, 2013, during July 2013 Lake Michigan had an average water level of 176.09 meters above sea level.

On July 28, 2020, during July 2020 Lake Michigan had an average water level of 177.45 meters above sea level.

The shoals between Washington Island and Rock Island are submerged and exposed with changing water levels on Lake Michigan

== Events ==
In July 2010, the Midsummer's Music Festival became the first performing organization to present a professional chamber music concert on Rock Island in the Viking boathouse, an event that was repeated in July 2011.

== Gallery ==
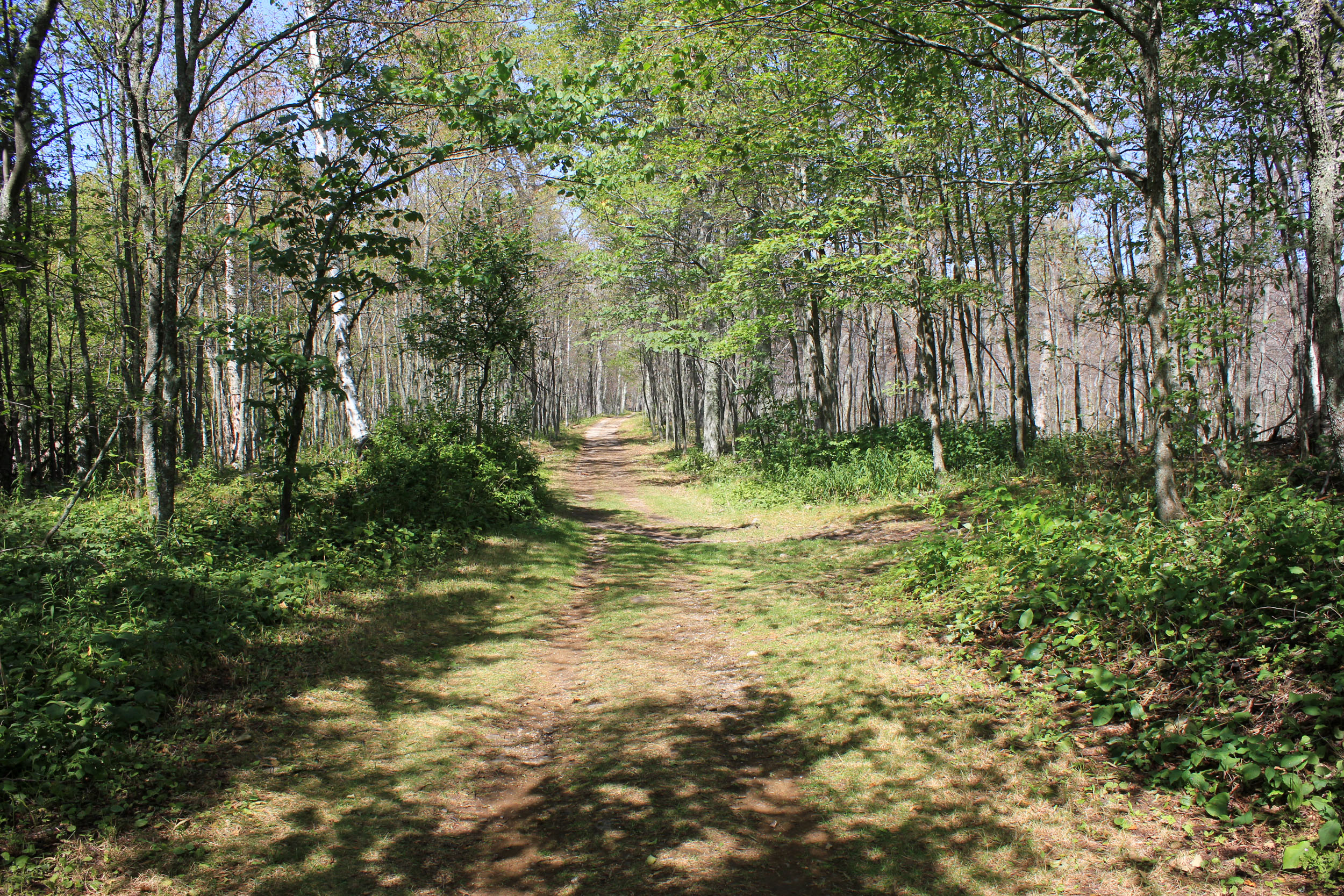
Hiking trail

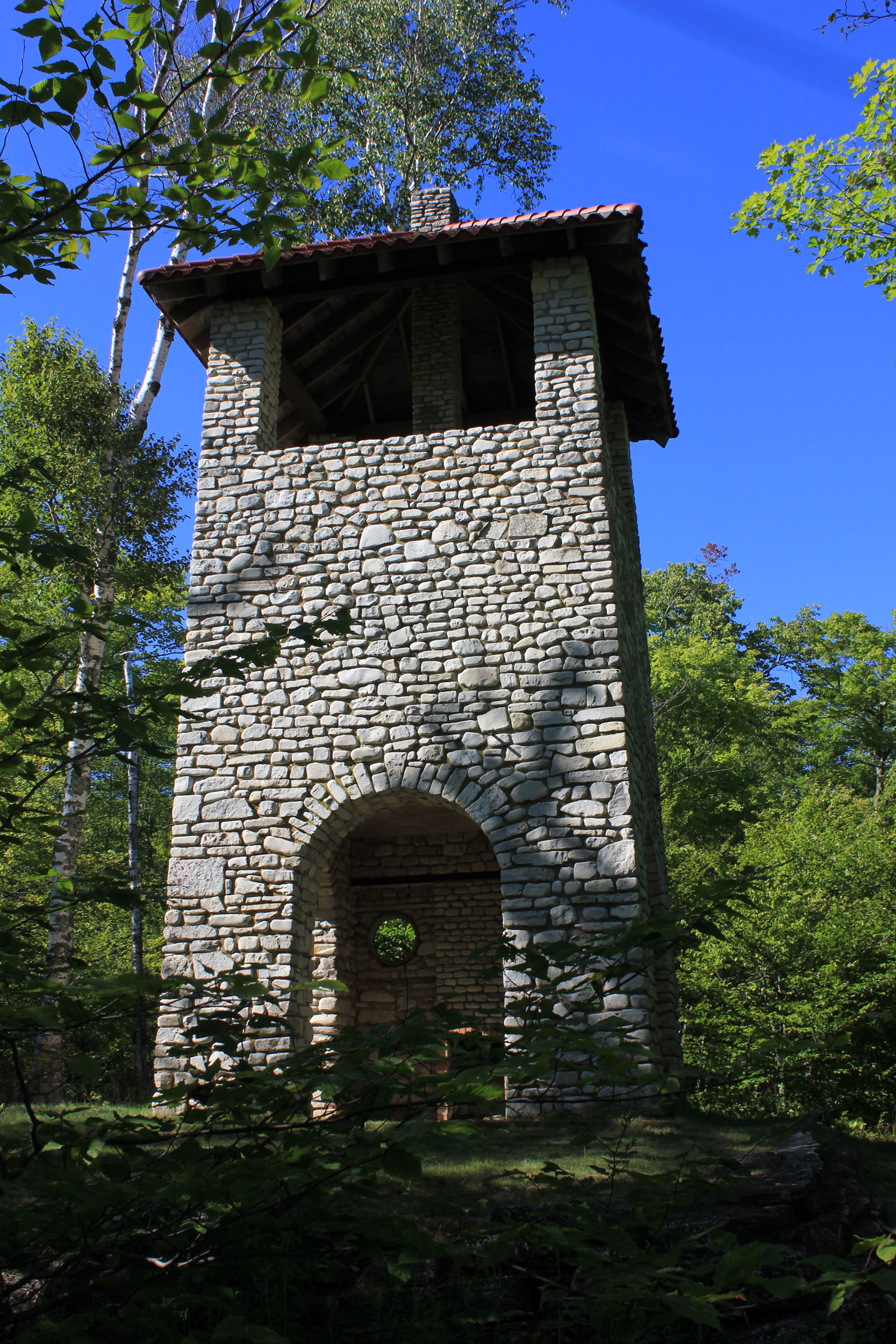
Water tower

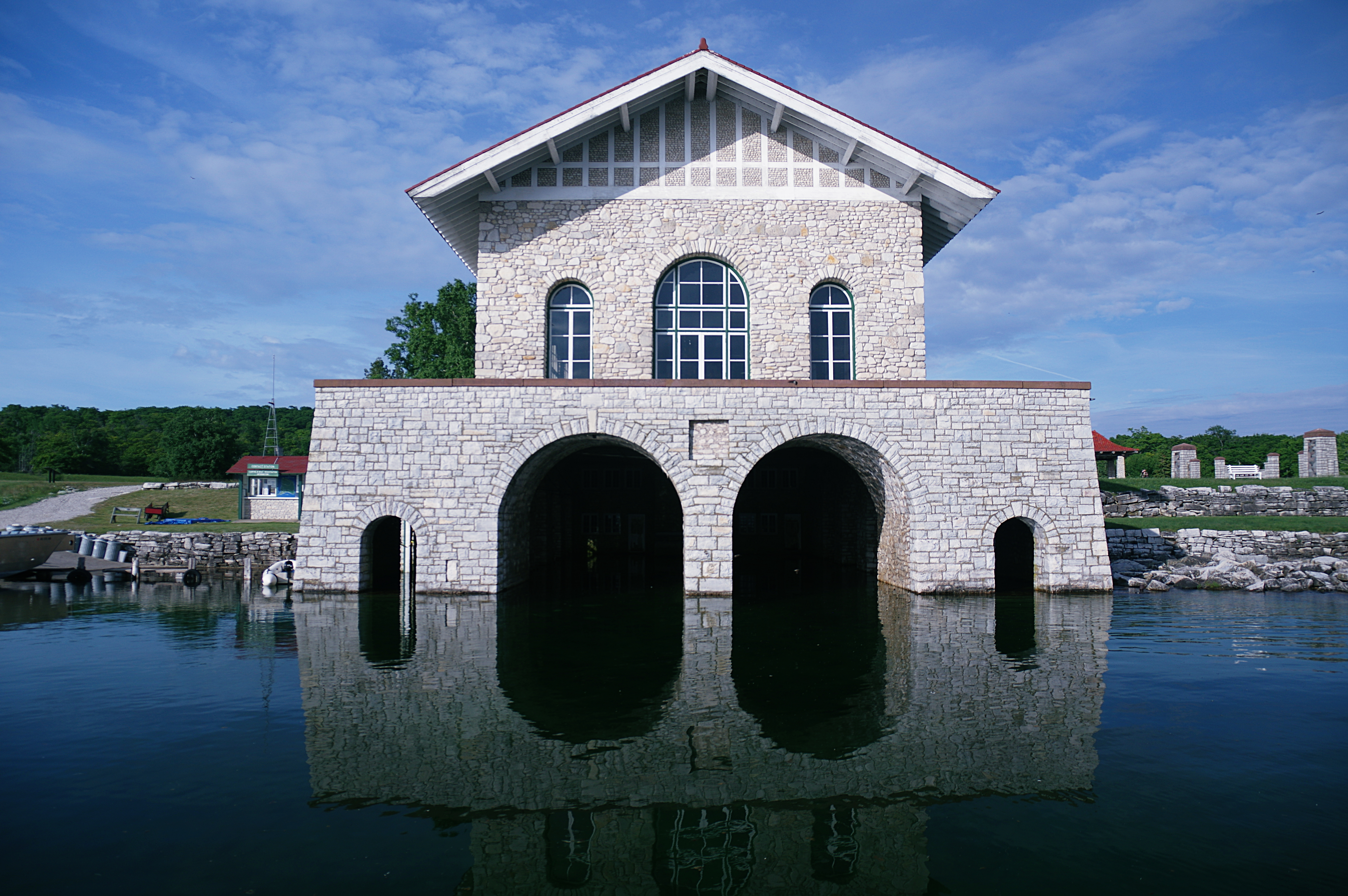
Boathouse

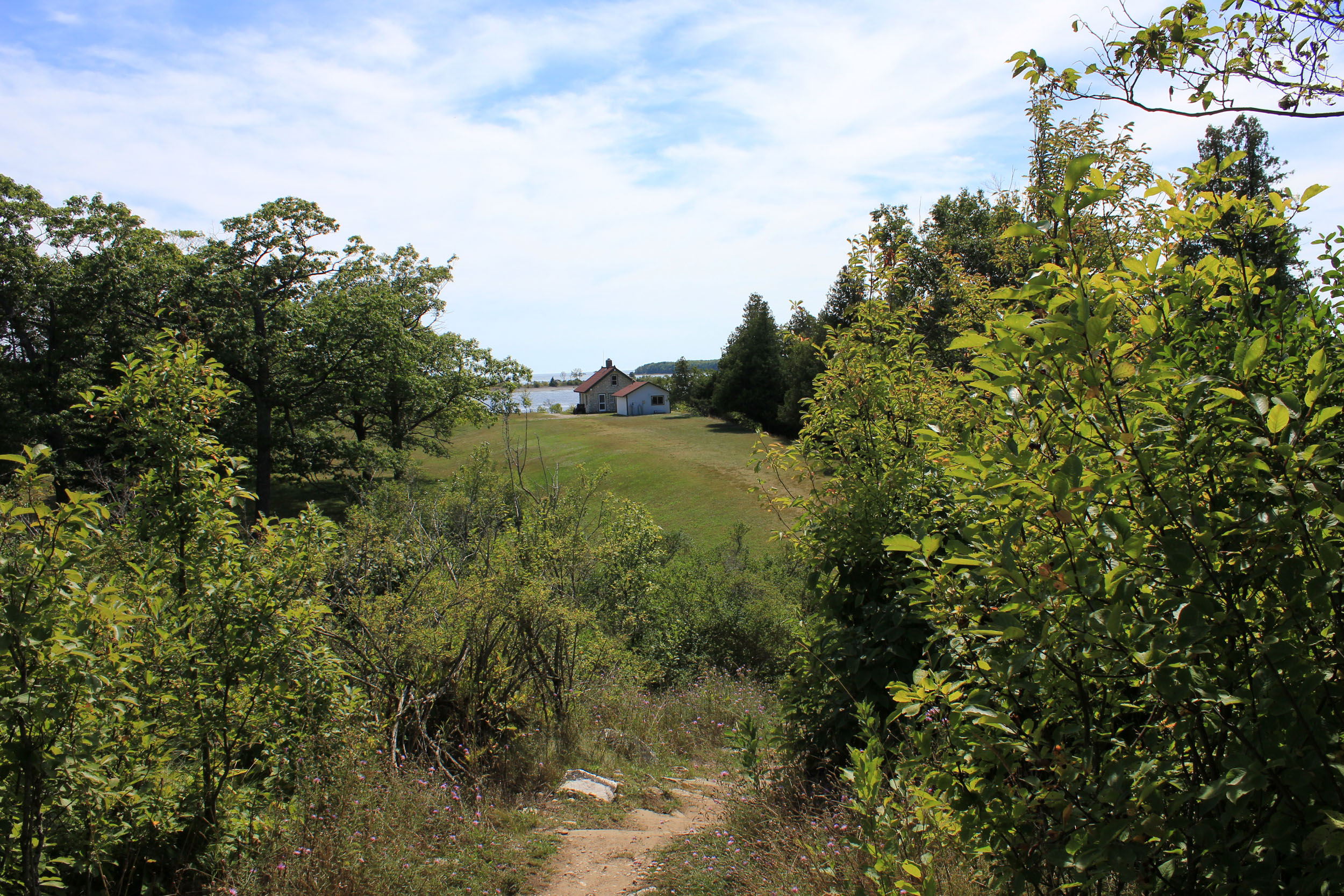
View from trail

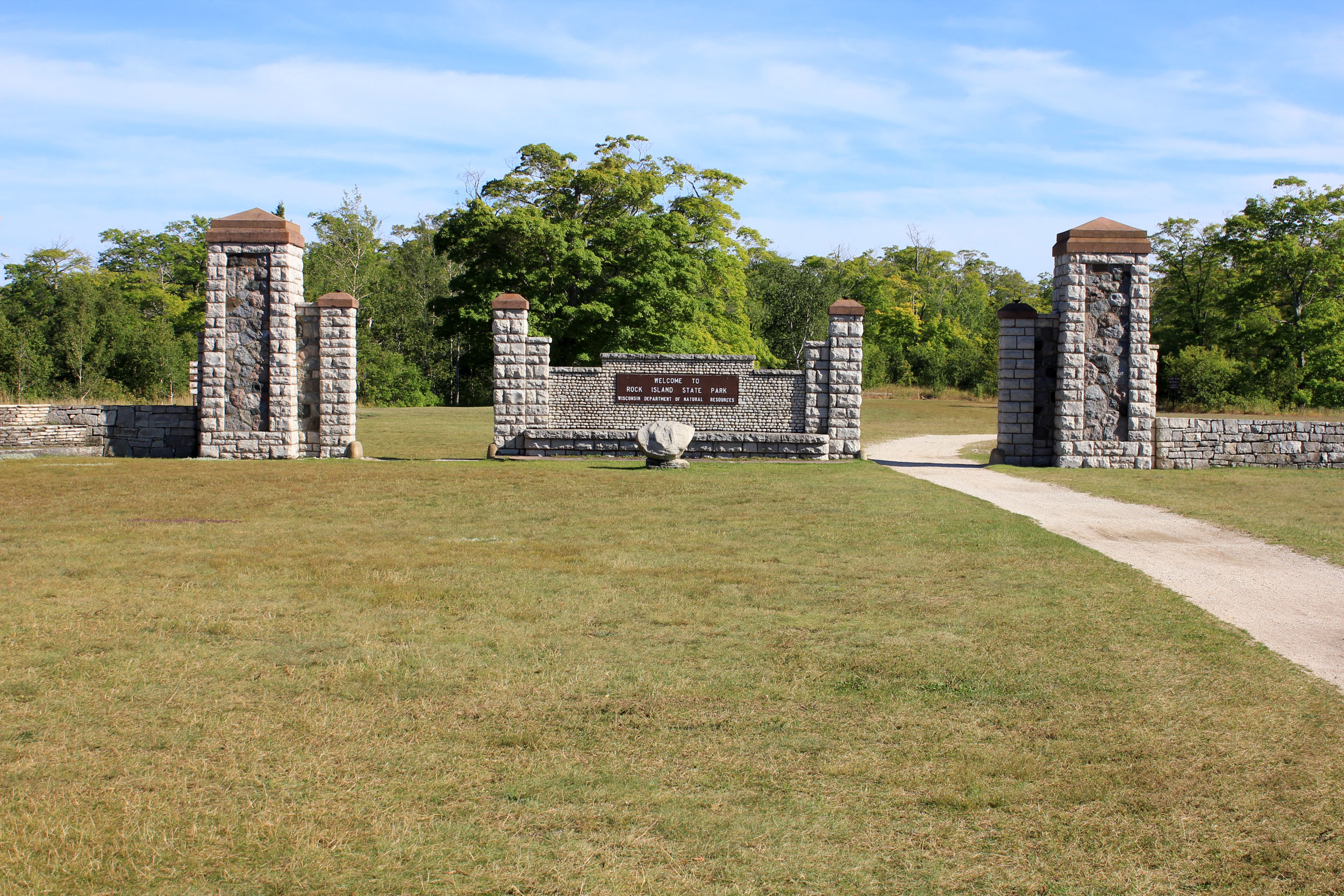
Entrance gate

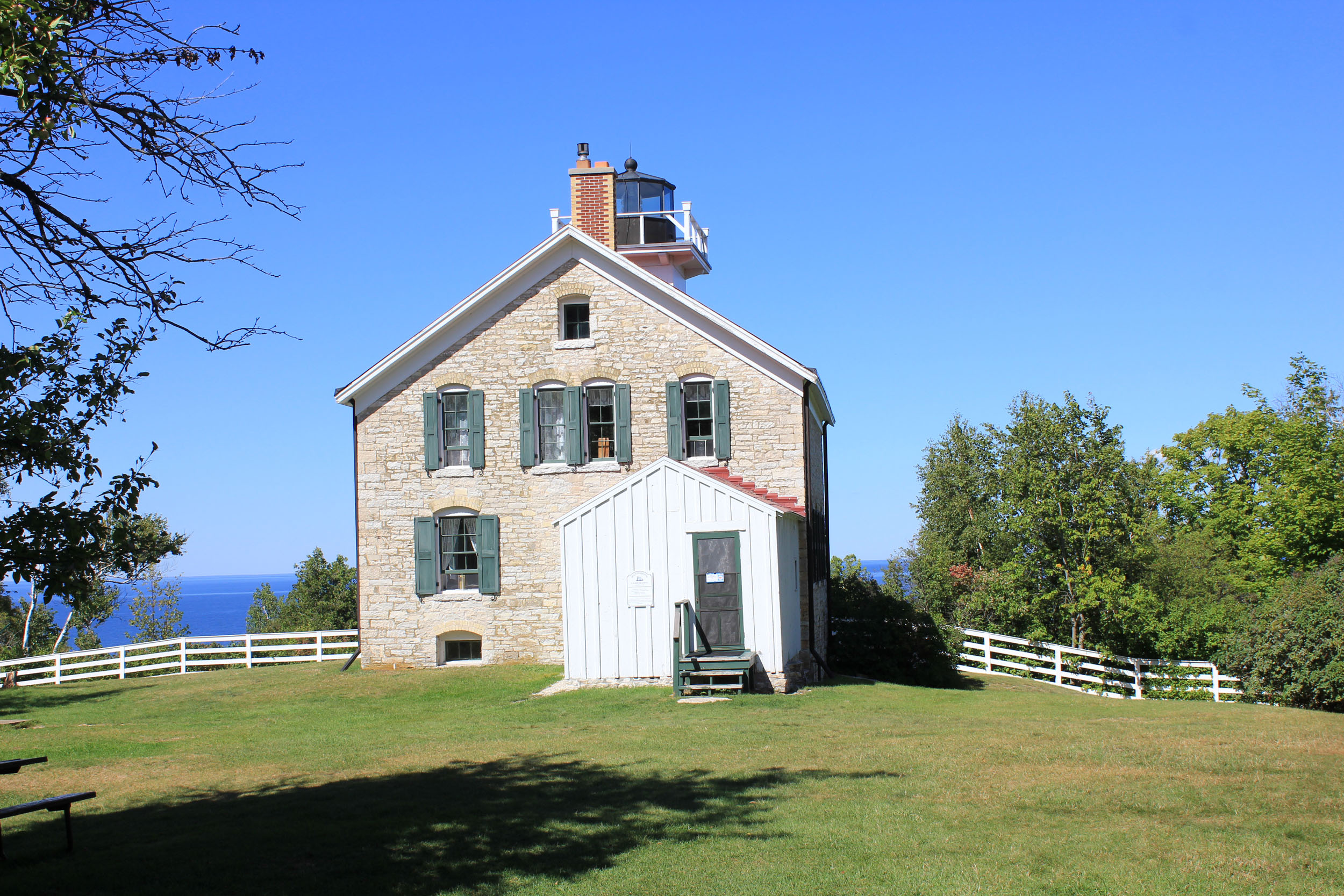
Lighthouse
