= San Rocco =

San Rocco (Italian for 'Saint Roch'), may refer to:

== Places in Italy ==
- San Rocco di Piegara, frazione of Roverè Veronese, Verona, Veneto, Italy
- San Rocco al Porto, commune in Province of Lodi, Lombardy, Italy

== Churches in Italy ==
- San Rocco, Capranica, region of Lazio
- San Rocco, Castel del Monte, region of Abruzzo
- San Rocco, Circello, province of Benevento, region of Campania
- San Rocco, Lendinara, province of Rovigo, region of Veneto
- San Rocco, Moliterno, province of Potenza, region of Basilicata
- San Rocco delle Carceri, Mondovì, province of Cuneo, region of Piedmont
- San Rocco, Montemurro, province of Potenza, region of Basilicata
- San Rocco, Piacenza, region of Emilia-Romagna
- San Rocco, Pisa, region of Tuscany
- San Rocco, Potenza, region of Basilicata
- San Rocco, Rome, region of Lazio
- San Rocco, Venice, region of Veneto

== Fortifications in Malta ==
- San Rocco Battery
- San Rocco Redoubt
- Fort Saint Rocco

== See also ==
- Rocco
- Oratorio di San Rocco (disambiguation)
- San Roque (disambiguation)
- São Roque (disambiguation)
