= Roco (surname) =

Roco is a surname. Notable people with the surname include:

- Bastián Roco (born 2003), Chilean professional footballer
- Bembol Roco (born 1953), Filipino actor
- Dominic Roco (born 1989), Filipino actor
- Enzo Roco (born 1992), Chilean professional footballer
- Felix Roco (born 1989), Filipino actor
- Juan Roco Campofrío (1565 – 1635), Roman Catholic prelate, Bishop of Coria and Badajoz
- Karen Roco (born 1986), Chilean canoeist
- Mihail Roco, founding chair of the US National Science and Technology Council
- Raul Roco (1941 – 2005), political figure in the Philippines
- Sonia Roco (born 1944), widow of Filipino senator and presidential candidate Raul Roco
- Sebastián Roco (born 1983), Chilean former footballer

== See also ==
- Roco (disambiguation)
- Rocco (surname)
