= Roco Kingdom (disambiguation) =

Roco Kingdom may refer to:

- Roco Kingdom: The Desire of Dragon, a 2013 Chinese animated film
- Roco Kingdom 3, a 2014 Chinese animated fantasy adventure film
- Roco Kingdom 4, a 2015 Chinese animated fantasy adventure film
- Roco Kingdom, a 2025 Chinese fantasy adventure video game

== See also ==
- Roco (disambiguation)
