= Rocco (disambiguation) =

Rocco is both a given name and a surname.

Rocco may also refer to:

- Rocco (film), 2016 French documentary film|
- Rocco (crater), the lunar crater
- Rocco Forte Hotels, British hotel group

== See also ==
- Rocca (disambiguation)
- Roco (disambiguation)
- San Rocco (disambiguation)
