= Rocco =

Rocco or Rocko is both a given name and a surname. Rocco is a masculine name of Italian origin. It is thought to derive from the Old German word "hrok", which means to rest or repose. The name is associated with a fourteenth-century Catholic saint, San Rocco, who tended to the ill during a plague. Notable people with the name include:

== First name ==
- Rocco Baldelli (born 1981), American Major League Baseball player and manager of the Minnesota Twins
- Rocco Botte (born 1983), American actor and filmmaker
- Rocco Buttiglione (born 1948), Italian politician
- Rocco Chinnici (1925–1983), Italian magistrate killed by the Mafia
- Rocco "Rocky" Colavito (1933–2024), American Major League Baseball player
- Rocco B. Commisso (1949–2026), Italian and American businessman, founder of Mediacom
- Rocco Coronel (born 2010), Dutch racing driver
- Rocco DiSpirito (born 1966), American celebrity chef and reality show actor
- Rocco Fischetti (1903–1964), American mobster
- Sir Rocco Forte (born 1945), British businessman
- Rocco George (born 2003), Filipino-American singer-songwriter
- Rocco Granata (born 1938), Italian-Belgian singer, songwriter, and accordionist
- Rocco Grimaldi (born 1993), American ice hockey player
- Rocco Hunt (born 1994), Italian rapper
- Rocco Landesman (born 1947), Broadway producer
- Rocco Marchegiano (1923–1969), better known as Rocky Marciano, American heavyweight boxer
- Rocco Mazzola (born 2005), Italian racing driver
- Rocco Mediate (born 1962), American golfer
- Rocco Milde (born 1969), German former footballer
- Rocco Nacino (born 1987), a Filipino actor
- Rocco Perri (1887–last seen 1944), Canadian bootlegger
- Rocco Petrone (1926–2006), Italian-American engineer and NASA executive
- Rocco Placentino (born 1982), Canadian soccer player
- Rocco Pozzi (1700–1780), Italian painter and engraver
- Rocco Quinn (born 1986), Scottish footballer
- Rocco Reitz (born 2002), German footballer
- Rocco Rossi (born 1962), Canadian politician
- Rocco Siffredi (born 1964), Italian pornographic film actor
- Rocco Silano (born 1962), American magician and actor
- Rocco Spindler (born 2002), American football player
- Rocco Steele (born 1964), American gay pornographic film actor
- Rocco van Straten (born 1991), Dutch snowboarder
- Rocco Zikarsky (born 2006), Australian basketball player

== Surname ==
- Alex Rocco (1936–2015), American actor
- Alfredo Rocco (1875–1935), Italian jurist and Fascist politician, author of the Italian Penal Code
- Carmine Rocco (1912–1982), Vatican diplomat
- Danny Rocco (born 1960), American college football head coach
- David Rocco (born 1970), Canadian actor and producer, host of David Rocco's Dolce Vita
- David Della Rocco (born 1952), actor
- John A. Rocco (1936–2020), American politician
- Keith Rocco (painter), contemporary American military painter
- Keith Rocco (racing driver)
- Lyla Rocco (1933–2015), Italian film actress
- Marc Rocco (1962–2009), American film director, producer and screenwriter
- Mickey Rocco (1916–1997), American Major League Baseball first baseman
- Nereo Rocco (1912–1979), Italian football player and manager
- Pasquale Rocco (born 1970), Italian retired footballer
- Steve Rocco (born 1960), American skateboarder and retired businessman
- Steve Rocco (boxer) (1908–1967), Canadian boxer
- Steve Rocco (politician), contemporary American politician
- Tonette S. Rocco (born 1954), American academic

== Nickname, stage name or ring name ==
- Rocko (rapper) (born 1979), American rapper and actor
- Dick "Rocko" Lewis (1908–1966), American entertainer
- Rocco Hunt (born 1994), Italian rapper
- Rocco Prestia (1951–2020), bass player for the band Tower of Power
- Rocco Mandroid, member of the New Zealand punk band the Futurians
- Rocko Schamoni (born 1966), German entertainer, author and musician
- Rocco Rock (1953–2002), American professional wrestler
- Mark Rocco (1951–2020), English retired professional wrestler
- Rocco Nacino (born 1987), Filipino actor

== Fictional characters ==
- Johnny Rocco, fugitive gangster in the 1948 film Key Largo, played by Edward G. Robinson
- Rocco Fuentes Echaguei, a fictional character in the 2002–2003 Argentine teenage telenovella Rebelde Way
- Rocco Parondi, in the 1960 Italian film Rocco and His Brothers
- Rocco Pelosi, a supportive character in Grand Theft Auto: The Ballad of Gay Tony and GTA V.
- Rocco the Beaver, a puppet on the Danish TV series Dolph & Wulff med Venner (Dolph & Wulff with Friends)
- Rocco the Dog, a puppet on the Canadian TV series Puppets Who Kill
- Rocco de' Medici, a master swordsman and long-lost heir to the late Duke of Florence in the TV series Leonardo.
- Rocco Barbella, one of Sergeant Bilko's corporals in The Phil Silvers Show
- Rocco Lampone, a fictional character in Mario Puzo's novel The Godfather and Francis Ford Coppola's The Godfather.
- Rocco, the puppy saved by Tom Hardy's character in The Drop
- Rocko, from Rocko's Modern Life, a 1990s Nickelodeon animated series
- Rocko, from Pink Panther and Sons, a 1980s animated series
- Rocko, from the cartoon series Undergrads
- Rocky Balboa, from the Rocky film series starring Sylvester Stallone as the films' title character, who is sometimes called Rocco.
- Rocko, a penguin from the 1995 animated film The Pebble and the Penguin.
- Rocco, Zoe's pet rock and Elmo's nemesis on Sesame Street.

== Other ==
- The West Maple Omaha Rock, a boulder in Omaha, Nebraska, nicknamed Rocko

== See also ==
- Roco (surname)
- San Rocco (disambiguation)
