= San Rocco, Lendinara =

Church in Lendinara, Italy

San Rocco is a small Renaissance style, Roman Catholic church located at the banks of the Adigetto in the city of Lendinara, in the province of Rovigo, region of Veneto, Italy.

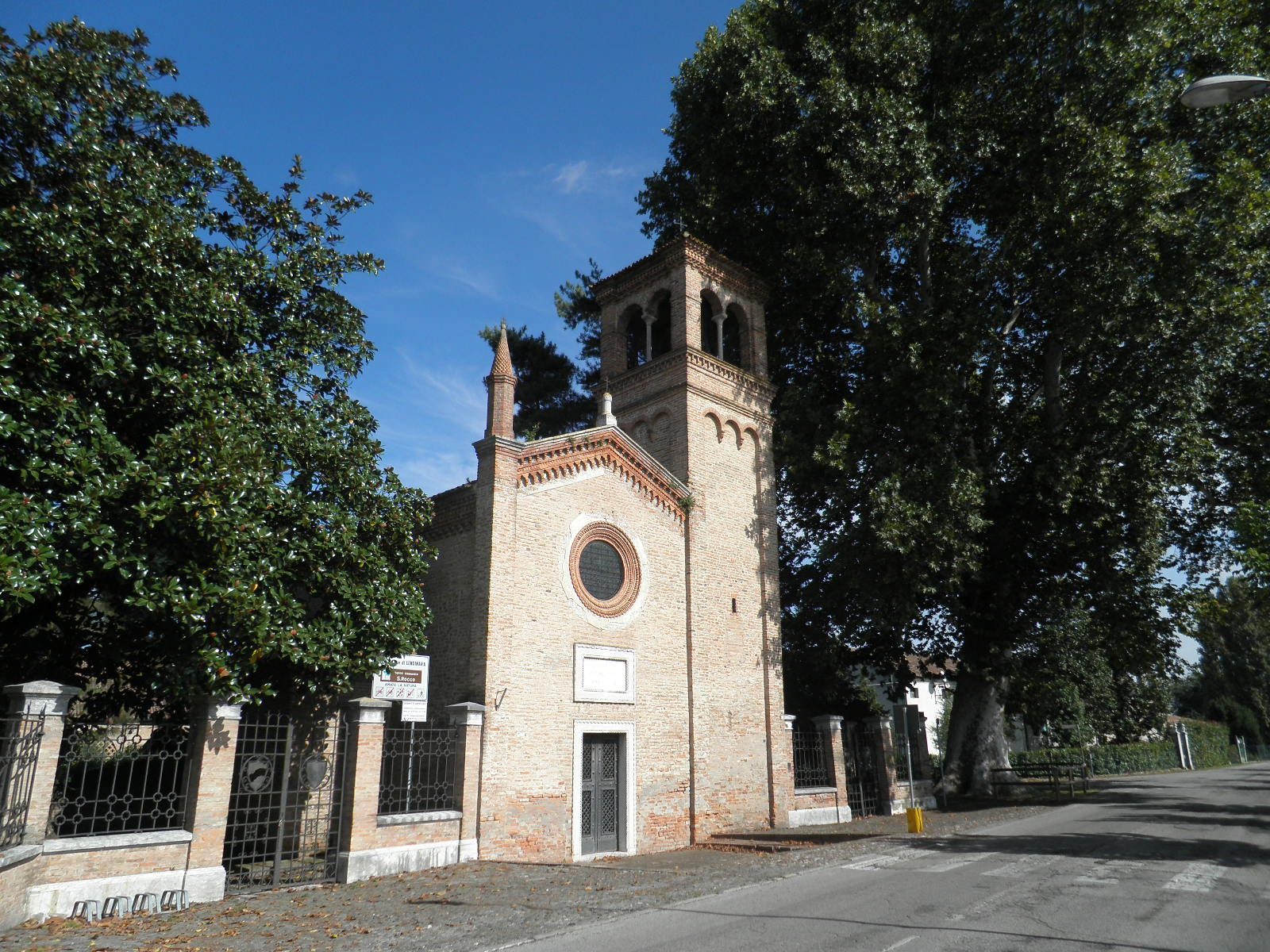
San Rocco, Lendinara

== History ==
This church, just outside the medieval city walls, was built in 1516, and dedicated to Saint Roch, the patron saint of those affected by the plague, which had afflicted the town in 1511. Adjacent to the church was a convent of the Order of the Serviti, suppressed in 1656. Between 1923 and 1927 the church became a monument for those fallen (caduti) in the first world war. The interior was frescoed with stories of the First World War by the Veronese painter Angelo Zamboni.
