= Oratorio di San Rocco =

Oratorio di San Rocco, an oratory for Saint Roch, may refer to:

- Oratorio di San Rocco, Cailungo
- Oratorio di San Rocco, Siena
- Oratorio di San Rocco, Spezzano
