= Roco =

Roco may refer to:

- Roco (model railroads), an Austrian manufacturer of model railway equipment
- Roco (surname), surname
- Roco Sandu (born 1966), former Romanian professional footballer

== See also ==
- Roca (disambiguation)
- Rocco (disambiguation)
- ROCO
- LocoRoco
- Roco Kingdom
