= San Rocco di Piegara =

- Frazione
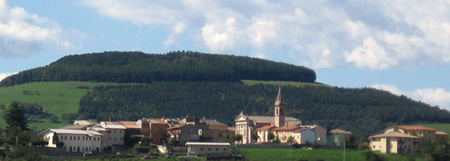

- Location of San Rocco di Piegara in Italy
- Coordinates: 45°33′N 11°05′E
- Country: Italy
- Region: Veneto
- Province: Verona
- Comune: Roverè Veronese
- Elevation: 640 m (2,100 ft)

Population (2009)
  - Total: 805
- Demonym: Sanrocchetti
- Time zone: UTC+1 (CET)
  - Summer (DST): UTC+2 (CEST)
- Postal code: 37028
- Dialing code: 045
- Patron saint: San Rocco
- Saint day: 16 August

San Rocco di Piegara is a frazione of Roverè Veronese (VR) which is one of the 13 ancient Cimbrian towns. Roverè Veronese has been an autonomous municipality since the 14th century.

== Etymology and history ==
The name San Rocco (Saint Roch) comes from a vote made by the population to the saint of Montpellier (who lived in the first half of the fourteenth century), who is the plague protector, during the plague of 1630–31. Piegara, the older toponym, perhaps derives from 'pegara' (a place full of traces left by cows).

== Geography ==
The village of San Rocco di Piegara lies on the lower Lessini Mountains, on the ridge between the Squaranto valley and the Mezzane valley, in a quite flat area where you can see the typical landscape of Lessinia. It can be reached through the provincial road SP-35 that begins in Montorio, about 6 km northeast of Verona. Along the way from south to north one meets the villages of Trezzolano and Cancello. From San Rocco continuing along the SP-35 one reaches San Vitale in Arco (4 km), which is also a frazione of Roverè, whilst turning east one finds San Mauro di Saline (5 km). The altitude at the village square is 640 m AMSL.

== The Parish Church ==
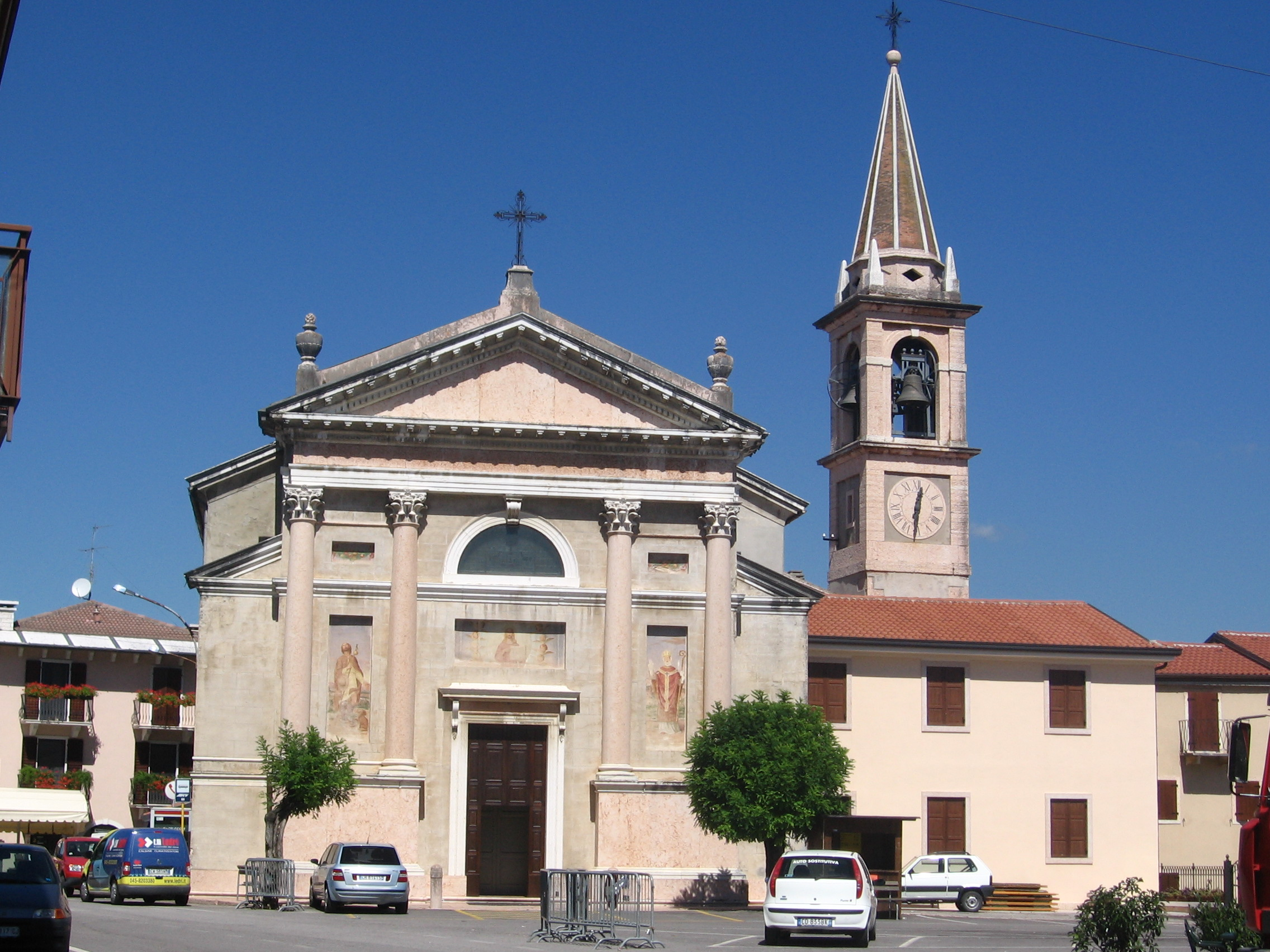
San Rocco di Piegara : the Parish Church

The first chapel built by the Counts Azzini dates back to the seventeenth century, although an earlier church may have preceded it. In the first half of the seventeenth century Piegara became independent from Cancello and subjected to the parish of Roverè, while in 1744 it became an independent parish.

The current church, dedicated to St. Rocco was constructed at the end of the seventeenth century after a fire destroyed the original structure. It opened for worship in 1875 and was completed in 1911 with a Corinthian facade. Today it features a central altar from the seventeenth century, four side altars of baroque style and preserves a valuable painting of the Madonna of the Rose painted by Domenico Maccacaro in 1600.

Of great interest is the canvas with St. Charles Borromeo (kneeling before the crucifix and moving towards the Council of Trento), with an enrollment of 1630, placed between the two altars on the right of the church, painted by Lorenzo Bertafino. The bell tower was built in 1888, although the modern cusp dates to 1952.

== The 'Contrade' ==
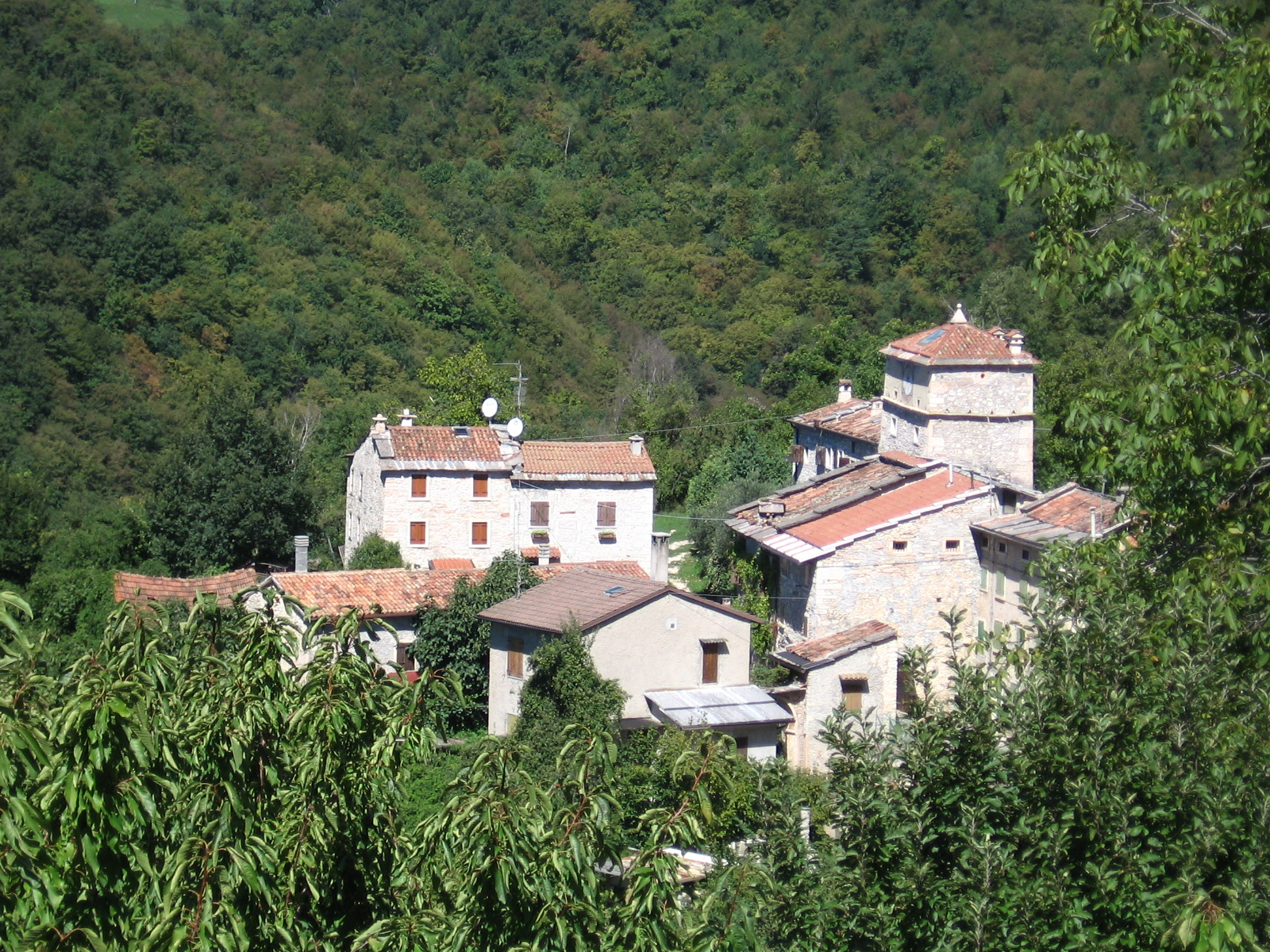
Contrada Vago

The 'contrade' are the typical districts of the settlement of the Lessini Mountains, consisting of single-family houses with stables and other buildings as the icehouses and the 'baiti', where cheese was made. The building materials were mainly two : the stone for the exterior and wood for the interior, as these materials are easily found in the surrounding area. Preferably they used to be built in sunny places and sheltered by a hillock. Around the districts there are quite a lot of meadows, which were once cultivated with rye and, in the lowest areas, with wheat, as well as numerous fruit trees, such as sour cherry, walnut, and in the lowest districts, even wild apple and pear trees; these trees, planted in regular rows, used to demarcate the boundaries of a property. Today the 'contrade' are connected with each other through streets, but once the steps were possible only by mule tracks or paths, allowing the transit of wagons.

== Economy ==
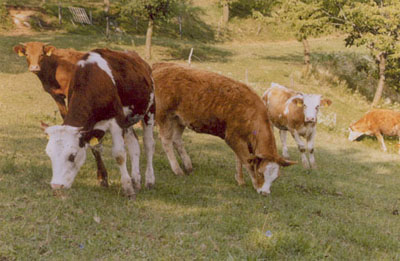
Cattle at contrada Negri

Local industrial activities include the manufacturing of hiking boots and mountaineering footwear across three factories of varying sizes, as well as a civil and road construction sector supported by various trade services, including masonry, carpentry, electrical, and plumbing work.

Agriculture consists not only in traditional products such as chestnuts or cherries but also in new crops and innovative techniques such as strawberries in hydroponic cultivation. The abundant presence of flowering lawns and fruit trees promotes beekeeping and honey production. The cattle is intended mainly for the production of milk, but some farmers have recently embarked on the sales activities of organic meat. The hilly position of the village and its vocation to summer holiday spot allowed the nearby places a development in tourism (hotels, restaurants, 'agriturismi').

== The Maroni Feast ==
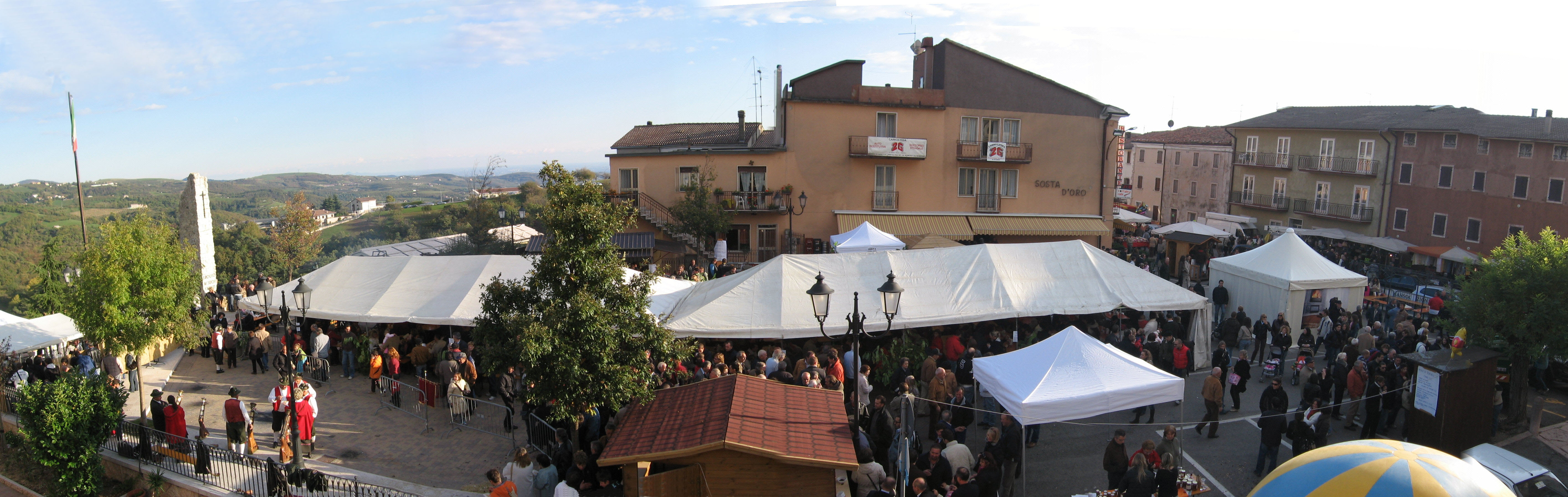
Maroni Feast 2007

The ancient feast of Maroni (chestnuts) is held annually in San Rocco di Piegara in the penultimate Sunday of October. Autumn welcomes the return of chestnuts and the village is full of people, inviting scents and colored stalls packed with local products.

In the main square, a giant "rostidora" cooks quintals of maroni, while enogastronomical stands offer tastings of wine and home-made food. At the celebration, skilled craftsmen offer demonstrations of crafts of ancient culture, such as timber and the production of baskets, with musical accompaniment in the background.

== Traditional annual events ==
- Feast of the Patron (San Rocco)

It is celebrated on 16 August and the residents of Roverè follow a procession through the streets of the district.

- Feast of 'Maroni'

An event that is held every year at the penultimate Sunday of October, with the tradition of the tasting of the most characteristical and appetizing fruit found on the Veronese mountain.

- Epiphany, "brusàr la vecia" (to burn the witch)

People of the district form conical heaps made of dry twig and chopped-off branches and they burn them on the evening of the 6 January. Above the bonfire a puppet, representing an old witch, hence the name, may be hung.

- St. Charles Borromeo, the "bread of the poor"

On 4 November, blessed bread is distributed to the population.
