= Roco Kingdom 3 =

- Directed by: Gong Bingsi
- Starring: Yang Ying; Yan Mengmeng; Huang Zhenji; Xin Shan; Tang Xiaoxi
- Release date: 10 July 2014
- Running time: 85 minutes
- Country: China
- Language: Mandarin
- Box office: US$7,050,000

Roco Kingdom 3 (Chinese: 洛克王国3：圣龙的守护) is a 2014 Chinese animated fantasy adventure film directed by Gong Bingsi and part of the Roco Kingdom film series. It was released on 10 July 2014. It was preceded by Roco Kingdom: The Desire of Dragon (2013) and was followed by Roco Kingdom 4 (2015).

== Voice cast ==
- Yang Ying
- Yan Mengmeng
- Huang Zhenji
- Xin Shan
- Tang Xiaoxi

== Reception ==
=== Box office ===
The film earned CN¥47.794 million at the Chinese box office.
