= Sebastián Roco =

Chilean footballer (born 1983)

Personal information
- Full name: Sebastián Alejandro Roco Melgarejo
- Date of birth: June 26, 1983 (age 43)
- Place of birth: San Felipe, Chile
- Height: 1.88 m (6 ft 2 in)
- Position: Centre back

Youth career
- Unión San Felipe

Senior career*
Years	Team	Apps	(Gls)
2002–2003	Unión San Felipe	21	(1)
2003–2007	Santiago Wanderers	95	(12)
2004	→ Deportes Temuco (loan)	37	(0)
2008–2009	Necaxa	0	(0)
2008	→ Audax Italiano (loan)	19	(1)
2008–2009	→ Gimnasia de Jujuy (loan)	19	(0)
2009	→ Everton (loan)	13	(1)
2010–2014	Cobreloa	128	(7)
2014–2016	Universidad de Concepción	10	(1)
2016–2017	Unión San Felipe	9	(0)
2018	Deportes Melipilla	0	(0)
Total		351	(23)

International career
2006–2007	Chile	6	(1)
- * Club domestic league appearances and goals

Sebastián Alejandro Roco Melgarejo (born 26 June 1983) is a Chilean former professional footballer who played as a centre back.

== Career ==
Roco began his football career aged 17 at the professional club of his city, Unión San Felipe of Chile's first division. In January 2003, he moved to Santiago Wanderers of Valparaíso, in where he was consecrated as centre back, scored 12 goals in 95 appearances and being many times in the nominations of the Chile national team, but the end of this was when he was marginated of the team on 14 November 2007.

However, despite his bad moment, in January 2008, his rights were acquired by the Mexican club Necaxa, being immediately loaned to Audax Italiano for play the Copa Libertadores of that year. After a regular season in the club of La Florida, he moved to the Argentine Primera División club Gimnasia de Jujuy for an undisclosed fee. Roco made his debut in a 4–0 away loss against Boca Juniors at La Bombonera, playing the full 90 minutes. On 1 July 2009, was confirmed his return to the Chilean football, because Everton signed him for the Clausura Tournament of that season.

The next season, was signed by Cobreloa, in where he was one of the key players of the runner-up earned in the 2011 Clausura Tournament lost against Universidad de Chile that in the season achieved the treble after of defeat to Cobreloa. On 2 March 2012, was reported that Flamengo would be interested in the services of the centre back.

Roco played internationally against the Chile national team in the 2007 Copa América in Venezuela, being call-up in that occasion by Nelson Acosta. He has played six times and scored one goal for the national team in his first match with Chile on 25 April 2006, in a 4–1 win over New Zealand on 24 April 2006.

== Personal life ==
Roco belongs to a football family from San Felipe since both his father, Marcial, and his son, Bastián, played for Unión San Felipe. In addition, the cousin of Marcial, Héctor Roco Lucero, is a historical player of Unión San Felipe and was the assistant coach of his son, Héctor Roco Leiva, from 2020 to 2021.

== Post-retirement ==
Roco started an eponymous football academy which competes at local and international level, has served as coach for Palmarés Oriente School from Quilicura and has performed as a football commentator in Radio La Metro alongside Luka Tudor and Fernando Solabarrieta.

== Career statistics ==
Goal	Date	Venue	Opponent	Score	Result	Competition
1	25 April 2006	Estadio El Teniente, Rancagua, Chile	New Zealand	2–1	4–1	Friendly

== Honours ==
Cobreloa

- Primera División de Chile runner-up: 2011 Clausura

Universidad de Concepción

- Copa Chile: 2014–15
