= Roco Kingdom 4 =

- Poster
- 洛克王国4：出发！巨人谷
- Directed by: Hugues Martel; Dongbiao Cao
- Production companies: Tencent Pictures; Jiangsu Youman Cartoon TV; Beijing Enlight Pictures; More Fun Studio; Wepiao
- Distributed by: Beijing Enlight Pictures; Dianping.com
- Release date: 13 August 2015
- Running time: 83 minutes
- Country: China
- Language: Mandarin
- Box office: CN¥77 million

Roco Kingdom 4 (Chinese: 洛克王国4：出发！巨人谷) is a 2015 Chinese animated fantasy adventure film directed by Hugues Martel and Dongbiao Cao and part of the Roco Kingdom film series. The film was released on 13 August 2015. It was preceded by Roco Kingdom 3 (2014).

== Voice cast ==
- Qi Zhang
- Hu Xia
- Ying Lin
- Guan Xiaotong
- Dian Tao
- Jia Zhan
- Lu Zhao
- Xin Zhang
- Beichen Liu
- Baiyue
- Shengbo Liu

== Reception ==
=== Box office ===
The film earned CN¥76.953 million at the Chinese box office.
