= San Rocco, Potenza =

Church in Basilicata, Italy

San Rocco is a Roman Catholic church located in the city of Potenza in the region of Basilicata, Italy.

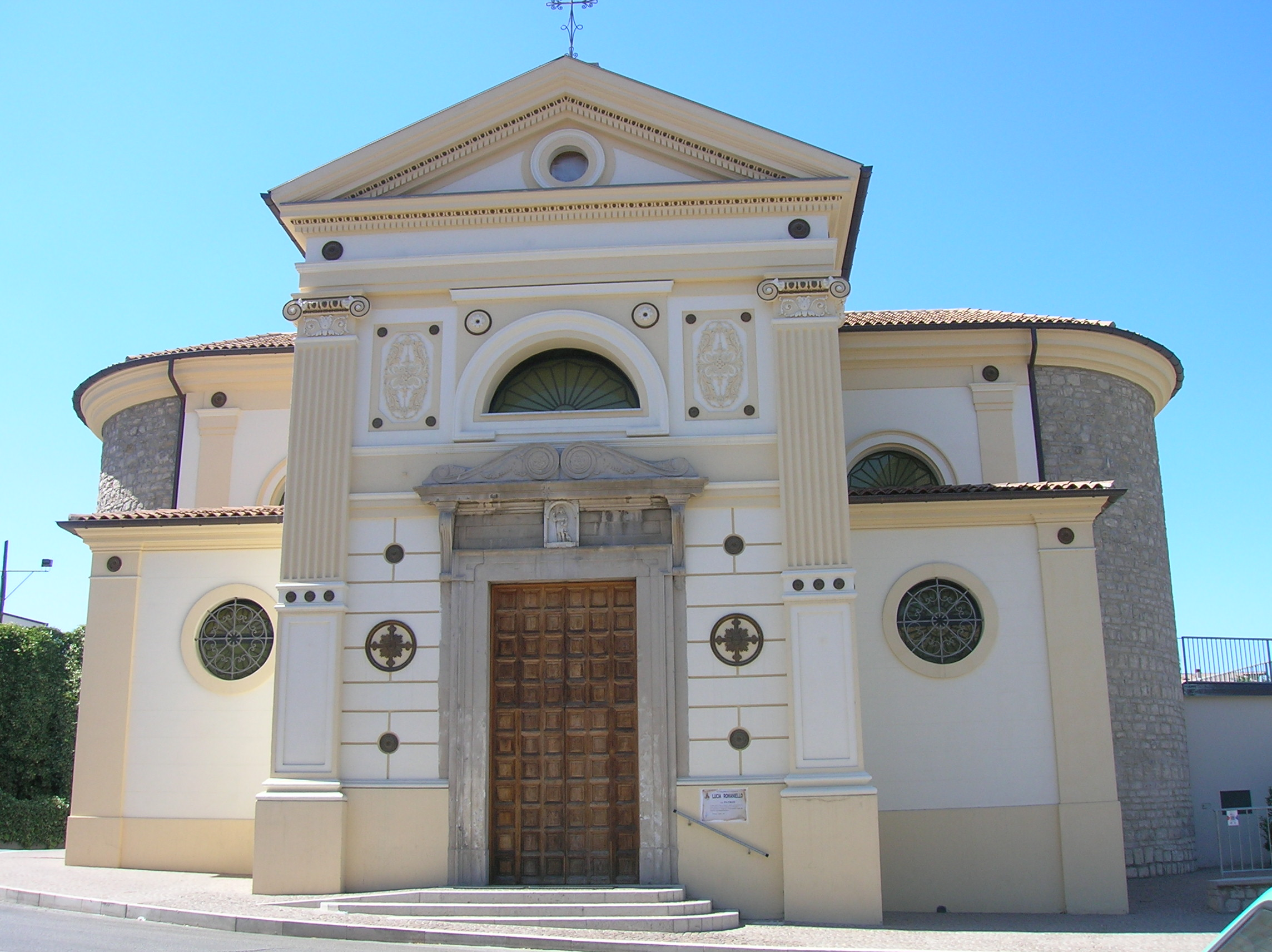
Facade of church

== History ==
A church or chapel was erected here between 1400 and 1500, after a season of the plague called the “Delle Ghiandole”. A confraternity associated with the chapel was given official recognition in 1789 by King Ferdinand IV of Naples.

But like many buildings in this earthquake prone region, the church collapsed in 1832, and reconstruction, occurred over the following decades. A marble relief of St Roch (1857) is located over the portal, sculpted by Michele Busciolano. The eclectic building references a variety of styles: it has a pyramidal dome and a neoclassic façade with flanking stone transept. The bell-tower has a non-functioning bell dating to 1565. To the right of the façade, beside the church, is a modern bronze statue of St Roch (1969).

Belltower between side chapel and apse

The counterfacade has an accumulation of spolia excavated or detached from local tombs. The chapel on the right has a polychrome wooden statue of St Roch (1859) carved by Michele Busciolano. The main altar has a 15th-century crucifix.
