= San Rocco, Piacenza =

Catholic parish church in Piacenza, Italy

San Rocco
- Chiesa di San Rocco
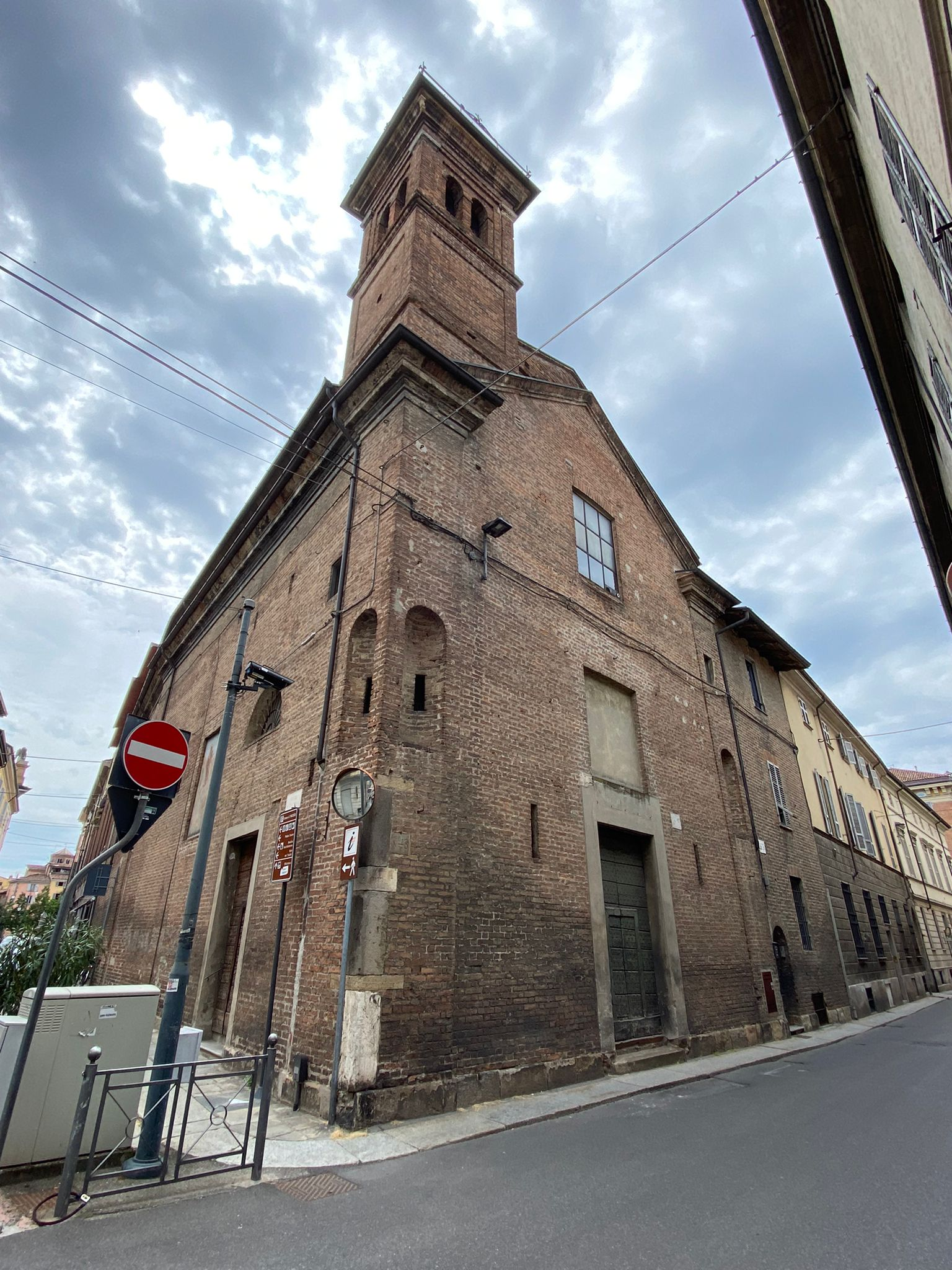
- San Rocco
- 45.051301°N 9.698614°E
- Location: Piacenza
- Country: Italy
- Denomination: Roman Catholic

History
- Founded: 16th Century
- Dedication: Saint Roch

Architecture
- Architectural type: Baroque

San Rocco Church (Italian: Chiesa di San Rocco) is a Roman Catholic church, located at the corner of Vie Roma and Legnano, two blocks northeast of the Duomo, in central Piacenza, Italy.

== History ==
It is dedicated to Saint Roch, patron of those afflicted by the Plague. It was constructed in the 16th century.

Commissioned by the Confraternity of San Rocco, while externally plain, the interior of the church was decorated in a rich late-Baroque or Rococo style. The church houses a canvas of Madonna and Saints by Giuseppe Nuvolone, a canvas of the Life of San Rocco by Giuseppe Gorla (1722) and a Glory of San Rocco by Paolo Bozzini.
