= Bastián Roco =

Chilean footballer (born 2003)

Personal information
- Full name: Bastián Alejandro Roco González
- Date of birth: 24 October 2003 (age 23)
- Place of birth: San Felipe, Chile
- Height: 1.83 m (6 ft 0 in)
- Position: Centre-back

Team information
- Current team: Unión Española

Youth career
- Unión San Felipe
- 2020–2021: Huachipato

Senior career*
Years	Team	Apps	(Gls)
2019–2020	Unión San Felipe	0	(0)
2020–2023	Huachipato	14	(0)
2024–	Unión Española	0	(0)

International career^{‡}
2019	Chile U15		
2021–2022	Chile U20	7	(0)
- * Club domestic league appearances and goals as of 6 January 2024 ‡ National team caps and goals as of 20 November 2022

Bastián Alejandro Roco González (born 24 October 2003) is a Chilean professional footballer who plays as a centre-back for Chilean Primera División side Unión Española.

== Club career ==
A product of Unión San Felipe youth team, Roco was a substitute in the Primera B match against Deportes La Serena on 2 June 2019, at the age of 15. In 2020, he was in a brief trial step with Estudiantes de La Plata.

In second half of 2020, he was transferred to Huachipato youth system, making his professional debut in the 2021 Copa Chile match against San Antonio Unido on 23 June 2021. He left Huachipato in December 2023, then the Chilean champions.

In 2024, he joined Unión Española.

== International career ==
Roco was part of the Chile U15 squad at the UEFA U-16 Development Tournament in Finland in April 2019. In December 2021, he represented Chile U20 at the friendly tournament Rául Coloma Rivas, playing the three matches. In July 2022, he made two appearances for Chile U20 against Peru U20.

== Personal life ==
Roco belongs to a football family from San Felipe since both his father, Sebastián, a former Chile international footballer, and his grandfather, Marcial, played for Unión San Felipe. In addition, the cousin of Marcial, Héctor Roco Lucero, is a historical player of Unión San Felipe and was the assistant coach of his son, Héctor Roco Leiva, from 2020 to 2021.

== Honours ==
Huachipato

- Chilean Primera División: 2023
