= Saint Roch =

Christian saint

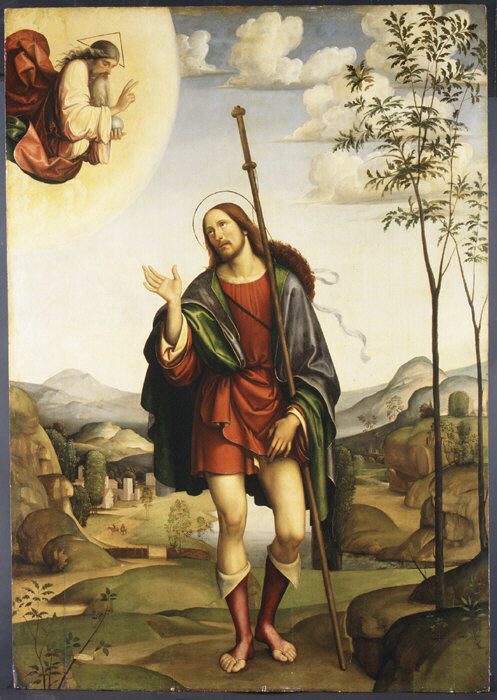
- Saint Roch by Francesco Francia

Confessor
- Born: c. 1348 (trad. 1295); Montpellier, Kingdom of Majorca
- Died: 15/16 August 1376/79; Voghera, County of Savoy (trad. 1327, Montpellier)
- Venerated in: Catholic Church; Anglican Communion; Aglipayan Church
- Canonized: by popular fervour; added to the Roman Martyrology by Pope Gregory XIV
- Feast: 16 August; 17 August (Third Order of Saint Francis)
- Attributes: Wound on thigh, dog offering bread, Pilgrim's hat, Pilgrim's staff
- Patronage: Invoked against: cholera, epidemics, knee problems, plague, skin diseases Patron of: bachelors, diseased cattle, dogs, falsely accused people, invalids, Istanbul, surgeons, tile-makers, grave-diggers, second-hand dealers, pilgrims, apothecaries: Sarmato, Altare, Patrica, and Girifalco (Italy); Pateros, Balubad, Lumban, Laguna, Cavite City and Caloocan as well as Cuyapo, Nueva Ecija, Cordova and Asturias in Cebu (Philippines)

Roch (lived c. 1348 – 15/16 August 1376/79; traditionally c. 1295 – 16 August 1327), (Note: The date was offered by Francesco Diedo, Vita Sancti Rochi 1478) also called Rock in English, was a Majorcan Catholic confessor whose death is commemorated on 16 August and 9 September in Italy; he was especially invoked against the plague.

He is a patron saint of dogs, invalids, falsely accused people, bachelors, and several other things. He is the patron saint of Dolo (near Venice) and Parma, as well as Casamassima, Cisterna di Latina and Palagiano (Italy). Saint Roch is the patron saint of the Central European region of Kociewie. He is also the patron saint of the towns of Arboleas and Albanchez, in Almería, southern Spain, and Deba, in the Basque Country.

Saint Roch is known as "São Roque" in Portuguese, as "Sant Roc" in Catalan, as "San Roque" in Spanish (including in former colonies of the Spanish colonial empire such as the Philippines), as "San Rocco" in Italian and as "Sveti Rok" in Slovenian and "Sveti Roko" in Croatian.

== Traditional biography ==
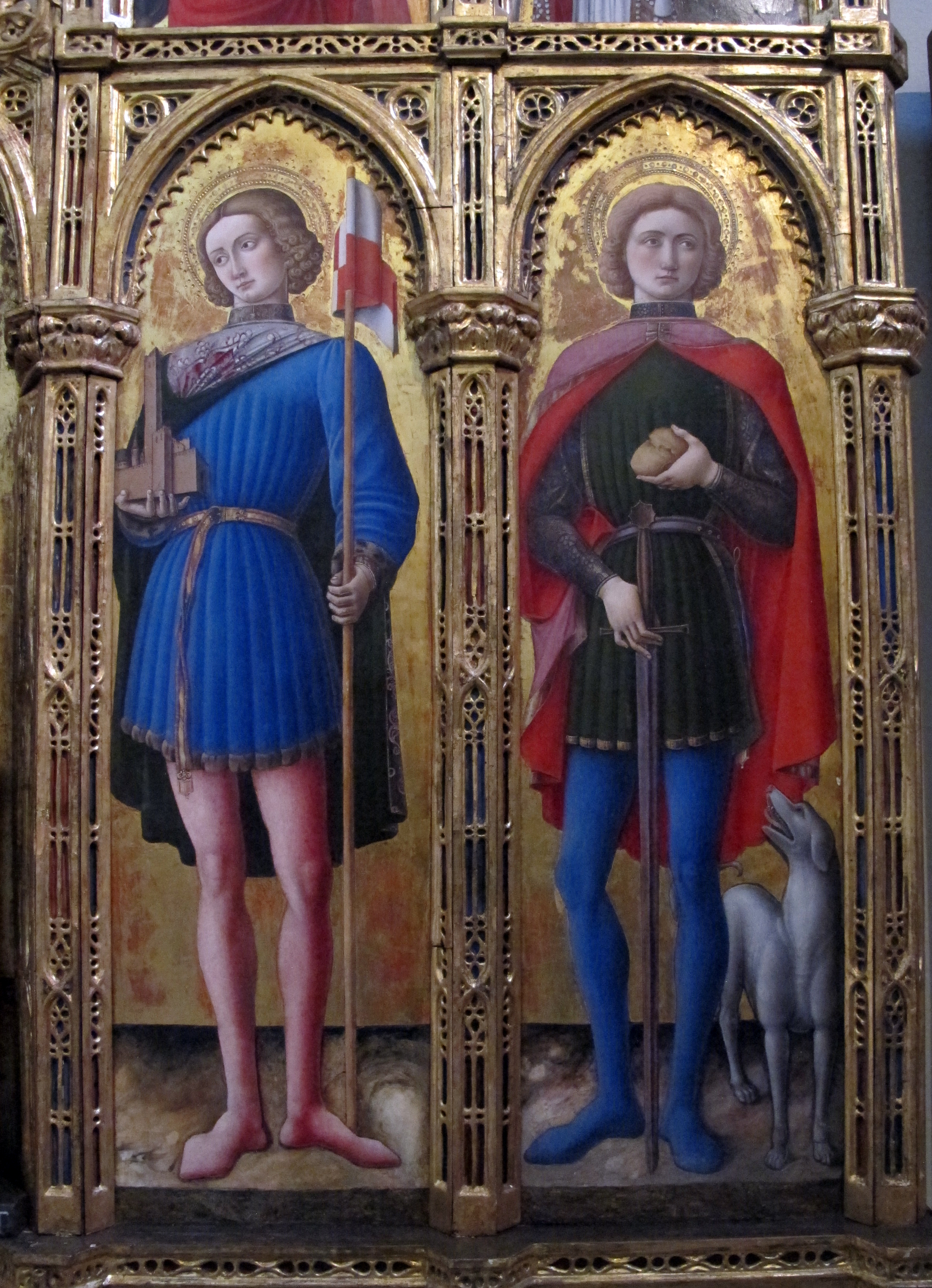
Saint Roch, in Pinacoteca Vaticana

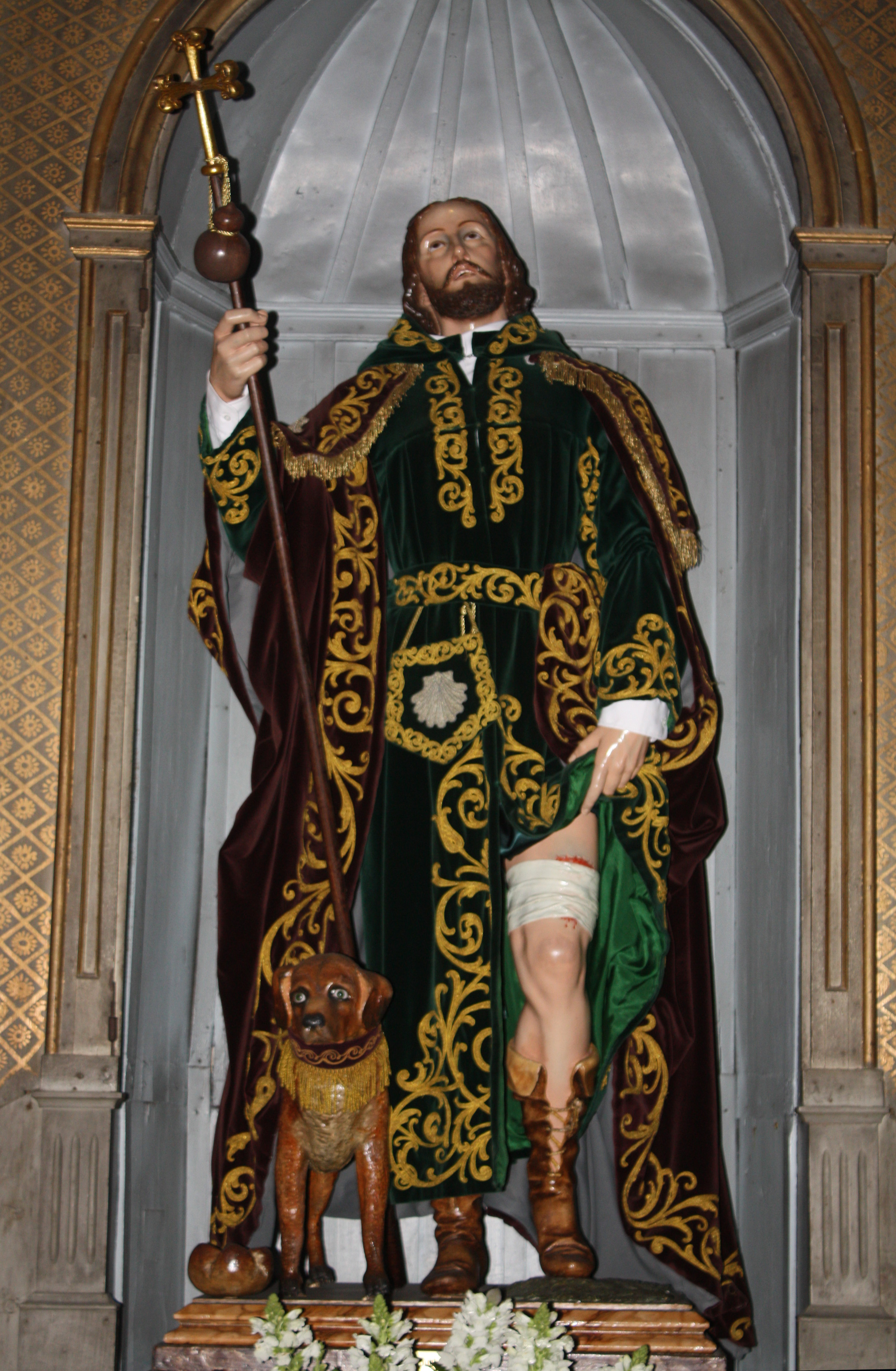
Saint Roch

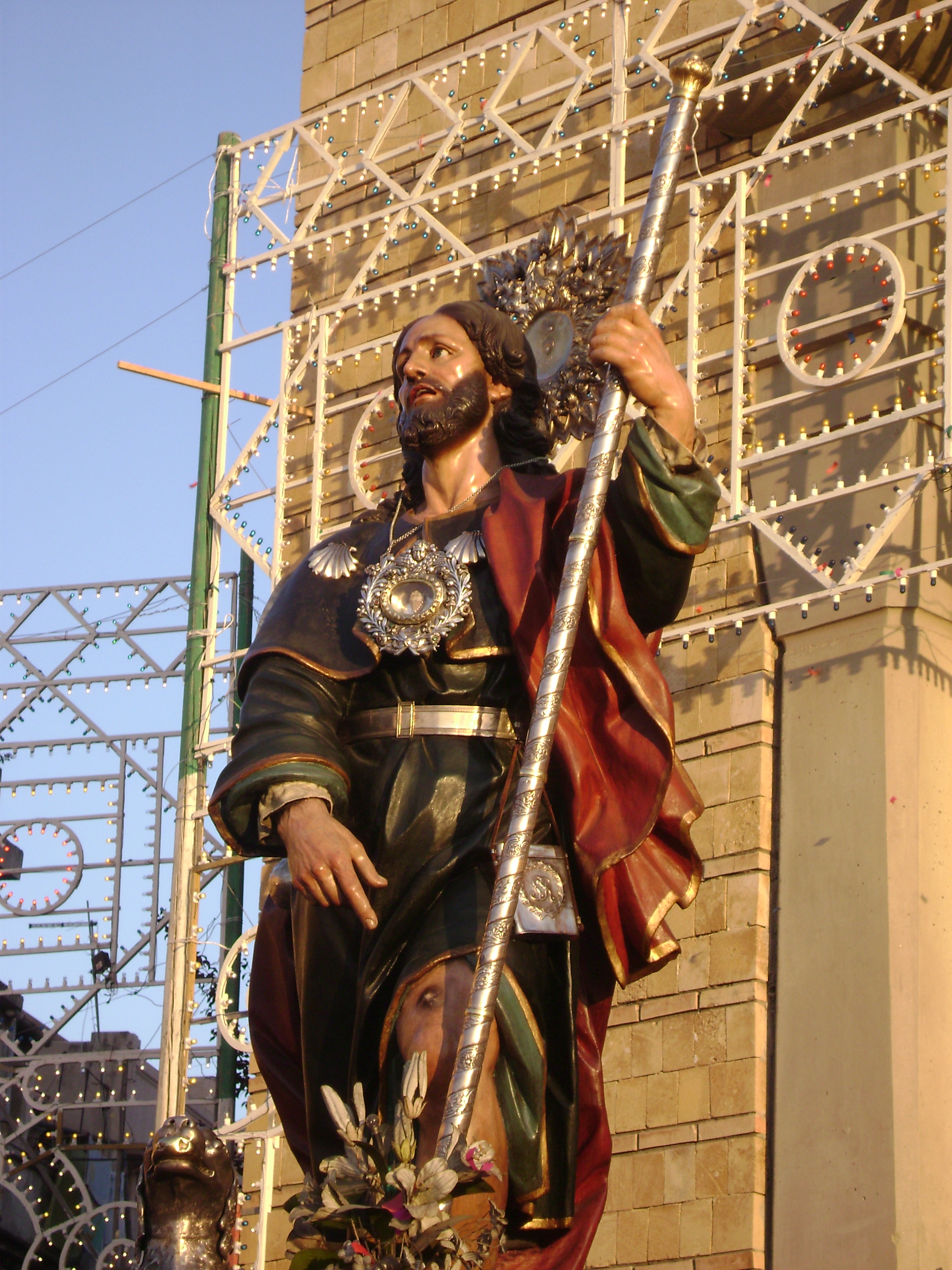
Saint Roch, Scilla, Calabria

The chronology of the Saint's life is uncertain and full of legendary elements. According to his Acta and his vita in the Golden Legend, he was born at Montpellier, at that time "upon the border of France," as the Golden Legend has it, (Note: An estimated date, about 1295, has been interpolated.) the son of the noble governor of that city. His birth was accounted a miracle, for his noble mother had been barren until she prayed to the Virgin Mary. Miraculously marked from birth with a red cross on his breast that grew as he did, he early began to manifest strict asceticism and great devoutness; on days when his "devout mother fasted twice in the week, and the blessed child Rocke abstained him twice also when his mother fasted in the week and would suck his mother but once that day."

On the death of his parents in his twentieth year he distributed all his worldly goods among the poor, entered the Franciscan Third Order, and set out as a mendicant pilgrim for Rome, (Note: He is conventionally portrayed with pilgrim's wide-brimmed hat, staff and purse.) although his father on his deathbed had designated him governor of Montpellier.

Coming into Italy during an epidemic of plague, he was very diligent in tending the sick in the public hospitals at Acquapendente, Cesena, Rimini, Novara, and Rome, and is said to have effected many miraculous cures by prayer and the sign of the cross and the touch of his hand. At Rome, according to the Golden Legend, he preserved the "cardinal of Angleria in Lombardy" (Note: Perhaps Angera was intended.) by making the mark of the cross on his forehead, which miraculously remained. Ministering at Piacenza at the hospital of Nostra Signora di Betlemme, he himself finally fell ill. He withdrew into the forest, where he made himself a hut of boughs and leaves, which was miraculously supplied with water by a spring that arose in the place; he would have perished had not a dog belonging to a nobleman named Gottardo Pallastrelli supplied him with bread and licked his wounds, healing them. Count Gottardo Pallastrelli, following his hunting dog that carried the bread, discovered Roch and brought him home to recover.

On his way back to return incognito to Montpellier, he was arrested at Voghera as a spy (by orders of his own uncle) and thrown into prison, where he languished five years and died on 16 August 1327, without revealing his name.

After his death, according to the Golden Legend;

anon an angel brought from heaven a table divinely written with letters of gold into the prison, which he laid under the head of S. Rocke. And in that table was written that God had granted to him his prayer, that is to wit, that who that calleth meekly to S. Rocke he shall not be hurt with any hurt of pestilence

The townspeople recognized him as well by his birthmark; (Note: Recognition by a birthmark — "the fairy sign-manual" as Nathaniel Hawthorne called it in "The Birthmark"—is a literary trope drawn from universal, sub-literary folktale morphology, given the designation H51.1 in Stith Thompson, Motif-Index of Folk-Literature (Indiana University Press) 1955–58; the birthmark recognition has figured in romance and marvel literature since Odysseus was recognized by his scar, long before the Hellenistic period; the birthmark-recognition motif can equally be found in Chinese and Mongolian narratives.) he was soon canonized in the popular mind, and a great church was erected in veneration.

The date (1327) asserted by Francesco Diedo for Roch's death would precede the traumatic advent of the Black Death in Europe (1347–49) after long centuries of absence, for which a rich iconography of the plague, its victims and its protective saints was soon developed, in which the iconography of Roche finds its historical place: previously the topos did not exist. In contrast, however, St. Roch of Montpellier cannot be dismissed based on the dates of a specific plague event. In medieval times, the term "plague" was used to indicate a whole array of illnesses and epidemics.

The first literary account is an undated Acta that is labelled, by comparison with the longer, elaborated accounts that were to follow, Acta Breviora, which relies almost entirely on standardized hagiographic topoi to celebrate and promote the cult of Roch.

The story that when the Council of Constance was threatened with plague in 1414, public processions and prayers for the intercession of Roch were ordered, and the outbreak ceased, is provided by Francesco Diedo, the Venetian governor of Brescia, in his Vita Sancti Rochi, 1478. The cult of Roch gained momentum during the bubonic plague that passed through northern Italy in 1477–79.

== Veneration ==
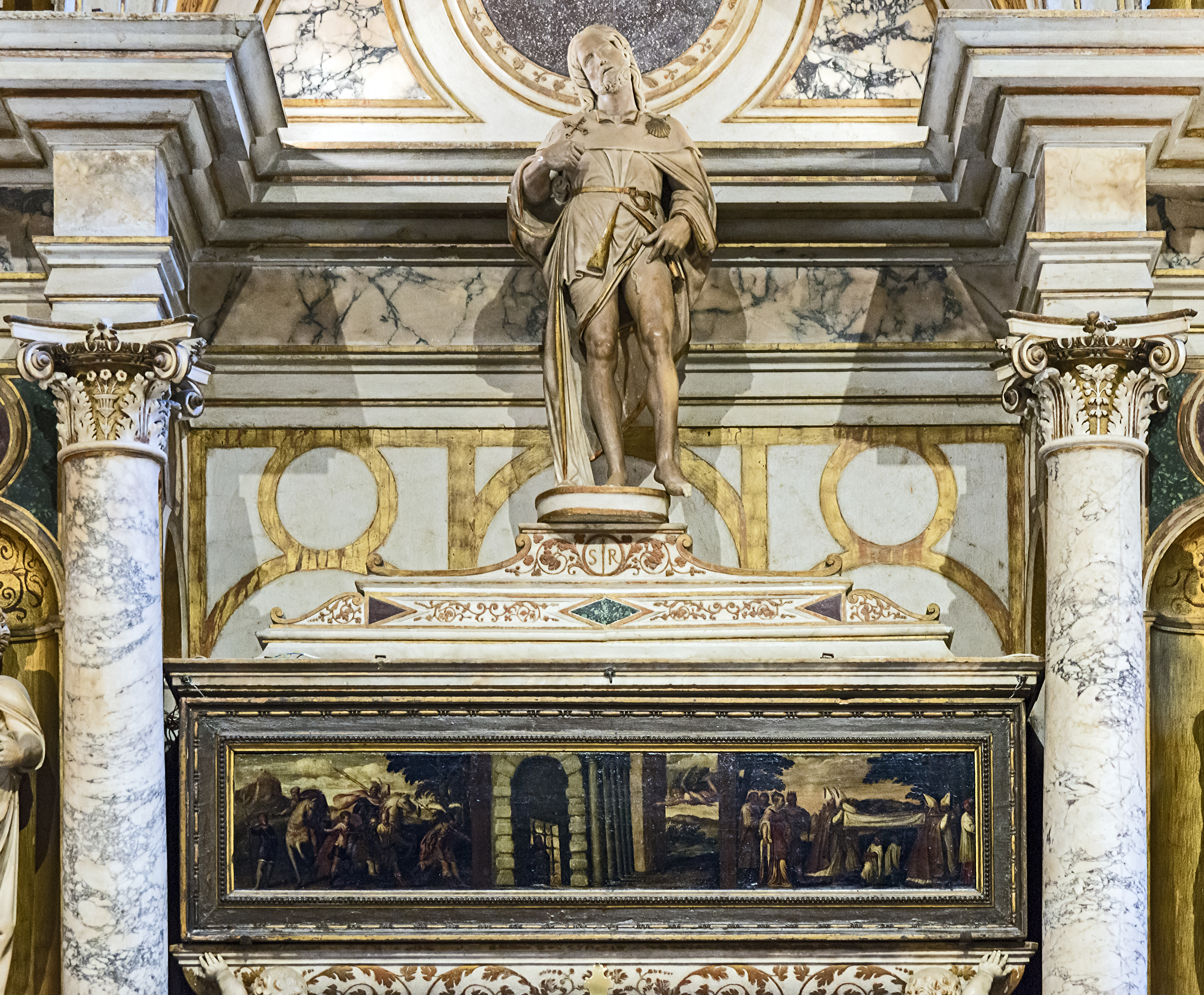
Tomb of Saint Roch in Venice

His popularity, originally in central and northern Italy and at Montpellier, spread through Spain, France, Lebanon, the Low Countries, Argentina, Brazil, and Germany, where he was often interpolated into the roster of the Fourteen Holy Helpers, whose veneration spread in the wake of the Black Death. The 16th-century Scuola Grande di San Rocco and the adjacent church of San Rocco were dedicated to him by a confraternity at Venice, where his body was said to have been surreptitiously translated and was triumphantly inaugurated in 1485; the Scuola Grande is famous for its sequence of paintings by Tintoretto, who painted Roch in glory in a ceiling canvas (1564).

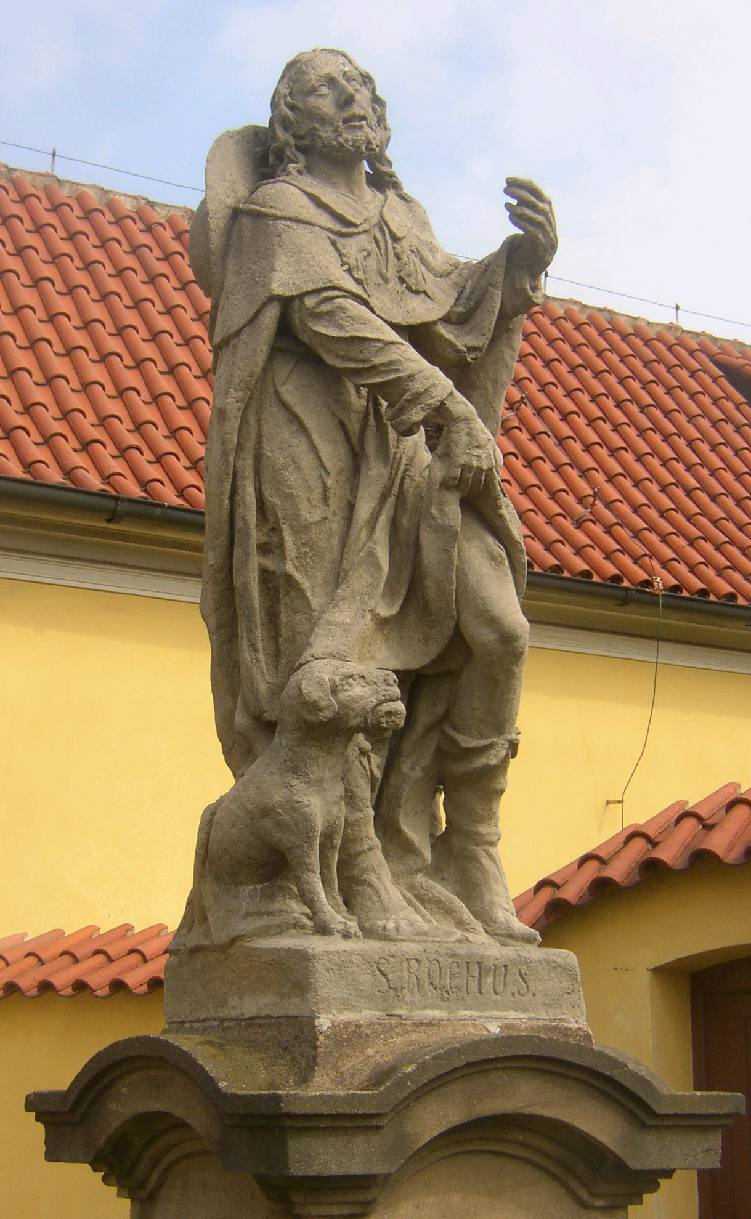
Statue of St. Roch, Bílá Hora, Prague (1751)

It is known for certain that the body of Roch was carried from Voghera, instead of Montpellier as previously thought, to Venice in 1485. Pope Alexander VI (1492–1503) built a church and a hospital in his honour. Pope Paul III (1534–1549) instituted a confraternity of St. Roch. This was raised to an archconfraternity in 1556 by Pope Paul IV; it still thrives today. Roch had not been officially recognized as yet as a saint, however. In 1590 the Venetian ambassador at Rome reported back to the Serenissima that he had been repeatedly urged to present the witnesses and documentation of the life and miracles of San Rocco, already deeply entrenched in the Venetian life, because Pope Sixtus V "is strong in his opinion either to canonize him or else to remove him from the ranks of the saints;" the ambassador had warned a cardinal of the general scandal that would result if the widely venerated San Rocco were impugned as an impostor. Sixtus did not pursue the matter but left it to later popes to proceed with the canonization process. His successor, Pope Gregory XIV (1590–1591), added Roch of Montpellier, who had already been memorialized in the Holy Sacrifice of the Mass for two centuries, to the Catholic Church Martyrology, thereby fixing August 16 as his universal feast day.

Statue of Saint Roch outside the Chapel of Hope (Chapelle de l'Espoir), dedicated to the victims of AIDS, Church of Saint-Pierre-Apôtre (Montreal)

Numerous brotherhoods have been instituted in his honour. He is usually represented in the garb of a pilgrim, often lifting his tunic to demonstrate the plague sore, or bubo, in his thigh, and accompanied by a dog carrying a loaf in its mouth. The Third Order of Saint Francis, by tradition, claims him as a member and includes his feast on its own calendar of saints, observing it on August 17.

The Catholic Church in Croatia, Bosnia and Herzegovina, Serbia and Montenegro venerates him as sveti Roko. Eponymous churches are numerous (cf. Crkva sv. Roka) including the Church of St. Roch in Petrovaradin in Serbia.

In India, there is a Church in Kerala in the name of Saint Roch under the Thrissur Archdiocese called St. Rocky's Church Pootharakkal. There is a huge statue of the saint about 24 feet in height (the first and only one in Asia). There is a special holy mass and Novena every Thursday. There is also another church dedicated to St.Roch at Poothura near Anjengo in the Archdiocese of Trivandrum and Major pilgrimage site of Saint Rocky is St. Rocky's Syro-Malabar Church, Manickamangalam.

Roch received renewed attention and veneration during the COVID-19 pandemic.

== Saint Roch in art ==
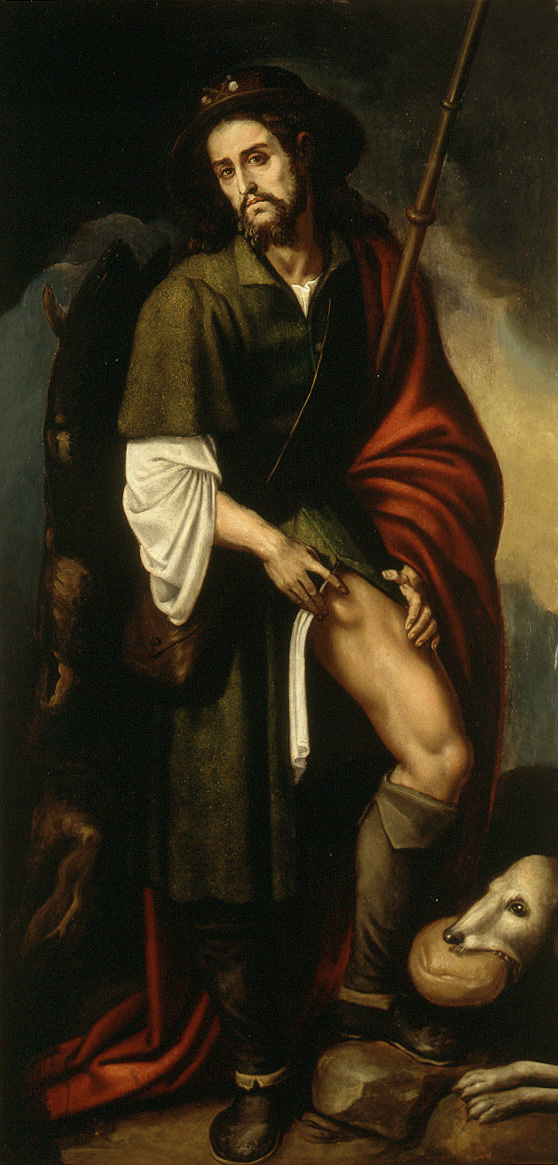
Saint Roch, by Francesco Ribalta, c. 1625, Museo de Bellas Artes, Valencia

Following the Black Death, especially the Italian plague epidemic of 1477–79, new images of Christian martyrs and saints appeared and Roch gained new fame and popularity. The religious art of the time emphasized the importance of the saint to plague-ridden Christians.

The new plague-related images of Roch were drawn from a variety of sources. Plague texts dating from ancient and classical times, as well as Christian, scientific and folk beliefs, all contributed to this emerging visual tradition. Some of the most popular symbols of plague were swords, darts, and most especially arrows. There was also a prevalence of memento mori themes, dark clouds, and astrological signs (signa magna) such as comets, which were often referenced by physicians and writers of plague tracts as causes of plague. The physical symptoms of plague – a raised arm, a tilted head, or a collapsed body – began to symbolize plague in post-Black Death paintings.

Plague saints offered hope and healing before, during, and after times of plague. A specific style of painting, the plague votive, was considered a talisman for warding off the plague. It portrayed a particular saint as an intercessor between God and the person or persons who commissioned the painting – usually a town, government, lay confraternity, or religious order to atone for the "collective guilt" of the community.

Rather than a society depressed and resigned to repeated epidemics, these votives represent people taking positive steps to regain control over their environment. Paintings of Roch represent the confidence in which renaissance worshipers sought to access supernatural aid in overcoming the ravages of the plague.

The very abundance of means by which people invoked the aid of the celestial court is essential in understanding Renaissance responses to the disease. Rather than depression or resignation, people "possessed a confidence that put even an apocalyptic disaster of the magnitude of the Black Death into perspective of God's secure and benevolent plan for humankind."

The plague votives functioned both to request intercessory aid from plague saints and to provide catharsis for a population that had just witnessed the profound bodily destruction of the plague. Showing plague saints such as Roch and Sebastian invoked the memory of the human suffering experienced by Christ during the Passion. In the art of Roch after 1477, the saint displayed the wounds of his martyrdom without evidence of pain or suffering. Roch actively lifted his clothing to display the plague bubo on his thigh. This display of his plague bubo showed that "he welcomed his disease as a divinely sent opportunity to imitate the sufferings of Christ... [his] patient endurance [of the physical suffering of plague was] a form of martyrdom."

Roch's status as a pilgrim who suffered the plague is paramount in his iconography. "The sight of Roch scarred by the plague yet alive and healthy must have been an emotionally-charged image of a promised cure. Here was literal proof that one could survive the plague, a saint who had triumphed over the disease in his own flesh."

== Saint Roch in literature ==
F. T. Prince published a long monologue from the perspective of Saint Roch's dog entitled 'His Dog and Pilgrim' in his 1983 collection Later On.

The breaking of a statue of Saint Roch is a crucial incident in the 1934 novel Clochemerle by Gabriel Chevallier.

In "The Story of San Michele" by Axel Munthe, San Rocco is invoked as the author appears for his judgement before the Almighty.

In Albert Camus' 1947 novel The Plague, worshippers in the cathedral of Oran are seen gathered around the statue of Saint Roch.

In the 1992 science fiction novel Doomsday Book by Connie Willis, a medieval priest who tends to plague victims is named Father Roche.

Saint Roch's dog is sometimes conflated with the folk saint Saint Guinefort, the holy greyhound.

Croatian celebrations around the saint are depicted in Miroslav Krleža's 1932 novel The Return of Philip Latinowicz.

== Saint Roch in other media ==
- A 2012 Philippine fantasy teleserye, Aso ni San Roque (lit. 'Saint Roch's Dog'), depicts a dog from the statue of San Roque coming to life to serve as a guardian of a blind girl.
- A 2014 film The Drop a gritty thriller about a bartender and his hardened employer. The stray dog in the movie was named after St. Rocco after the main character visits a Catholic church to pray and sees a statue of Saint Roch in the church.
- In The Godfather Part II (1974), the character Vito Corleone shoots Don Fannuci dead in the middle of a San Roque celebration in Little Italy, New York, thus beginning his legacy as Don Corleone.
- 1945 Italian landmark film Rome, Open City mentions in passing that statues of St. Roch as "more in demand" than those of St Anthony nowadays.
- Saint Roch appears in the 2023 satirical Indian Malayalam film Enthada Saji where he is portrayed by Kunchacko Boban.
- 'San Rocco' is the name of a tune by Derek Williams b. 1945 given to the hymn 'Give me the wings of faith to rise' by Isaac Watts 1674-1748 (New English Hymnal #225b).

== See also ==
- Igreja de São Roque, Catholic Church in Lisbon, Portugal
- San Rocco, Catholic church in Piacenza, Italy

== General references ==
- - Acta sanctorum, August, iii.
  - Charles Cahier, Les Characteristiques des saints, Paris, 1867
