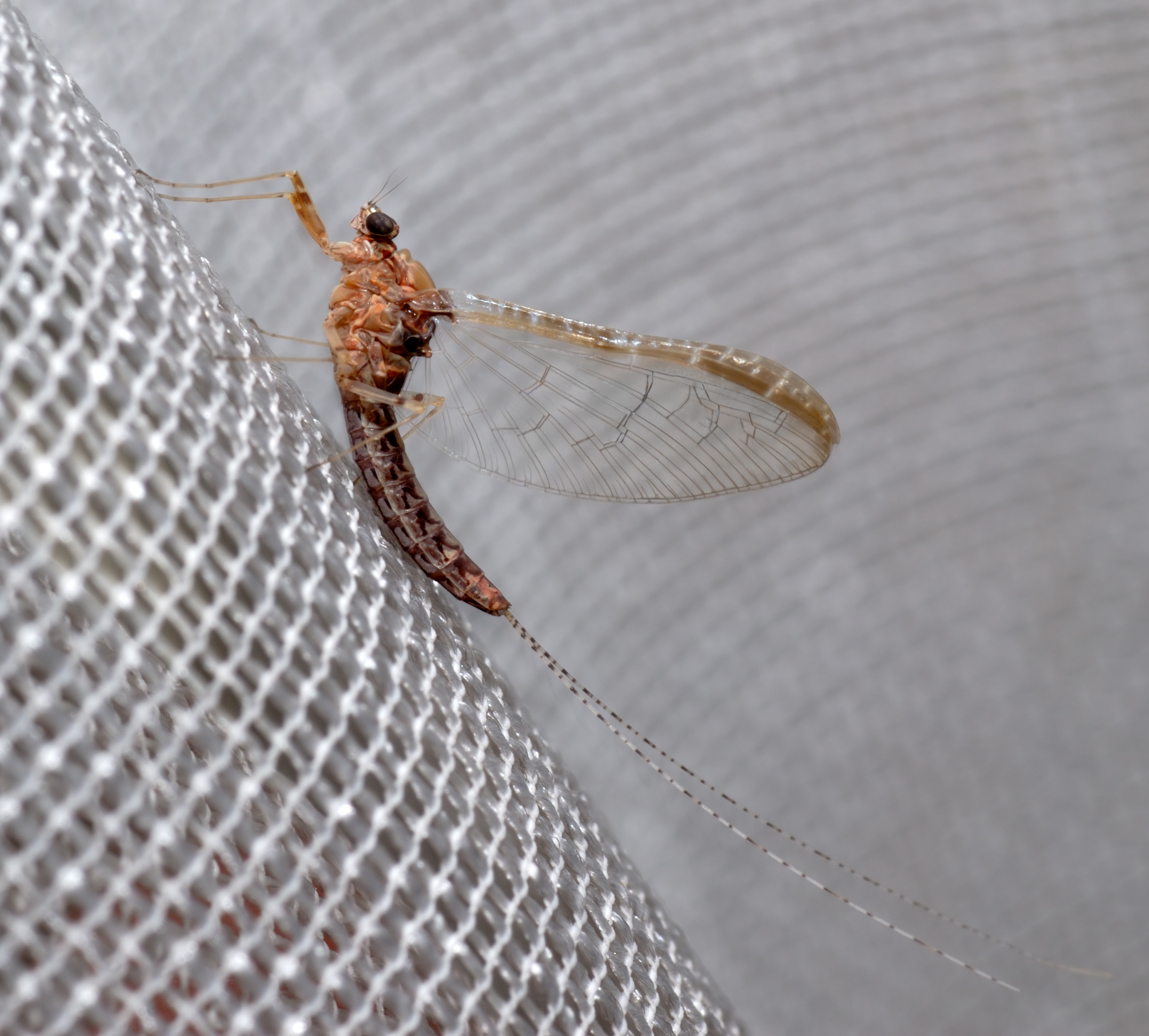
- Cloeon dipterum

Scientific classification
- Kingdom: Animalia
- Phylum: Arthropoda
- Class: Insecta
- Order: Ephemeroptera
- Suborder: Schistonota
- Superfamily: Baetoidea

Diversity
- >103 genera >1400 species

= Baetoidea =

Superfamily of mayflies

Baetoidea is a superfamily of mayflies, which probably includes the most primitive living species.

== Families ==
Five families are currently recognised by the Catalogue Of Life:

- Ameletidae McCafferty, 1991 – 62 species
  - Ameletus Eaton, 1885 – 59 species
  - Metreletus Demoulin, 1951 – 3 species
- Ametropodidae Bengtsson, 1913 – 3 species
  - Ametropus Albarda, 1878 – 3 species
- Baetidae Leach, 1815 – 1,325 species
  - Acanthiops Waltz & McCafferty, 1987 – 15 species
  - Acentrella Bengtsson, 1912 – 27 species
  - Acerobiella Gattolliat, 2012 – 1 species
  - Acerpenna Waltz & McCafferty, 1987 – 3 species
  - Acetrella – 1 species
  - Adebrotus Lugo-Ortiz & McCafferty, 1995 – 2 species
  - Adnoptilum Gattolliat & Monaghan, 2010 – 2 species
  - Afrobaetodes Demoulin, 1970 – 2 species
  - Afroptilum Gillies, 1990 – 10 species
  - Alainites Waltz & McCafferty, 1984 – 24 species
  - Americabaetis Kluge, 1992 – 22 species
  - Anafroptilum Kluge, 2011 – 4 species
  - Andesiops Lugo-Ortiz & McCafferty, 1999 – 4 species
  - Apobaetis Day, 1955 – 23 species
  - Arcobaetis Kaltenbach, Klug & Gattolliat, 2023 – 5 species
  - Asiobaetodes Gattolliat, 2012 – 1 species
  - Aturbina Lugo-Ortiz & McCafferty, 1996 – 4 species
  - Baetiella Ueno, 1931 – 18 species
  - Baetis Leach, 1815 – 188 species
  - Baetodes Needham & Murphy, 1924 – 50 species
  - Baetopus Keffermüller, 1960 – 4 species
  - Barbaetis Waltz & McCafferty, 1985 – 1 species
  - Barnumus McCafferty & Lugo-Ortiz, 1998 – 1 species
  - Branchiobaetis Kaltenbach, Kluge & Gattolliat, 2022 – 7 species
  - Bugilliesia Lugo-Ortiz & McCafferty, 1997 – 10 species
  - Bungona Harker, 1957 – 7 species
  - Callibaetis Eaton, 1881 – 41 species
  - Camelobaetidius Demoulin, 1966 – 46 species
  - Centroptella Braasch & Soldán, 1980 – 6 species
  - Centroptiloides Lestage, 1919 – 2 species
  - Centroptilum Eaton, 1869 – 32 species
  - Chane Nieto, 2003 – 1 species
  - Cheleocloeon Wuillot & Gillies, 1994 – 13 species
  - Chopralla Waltz & McCafferty, 1987 – 6 species
  - Cloeodes Traver, 1938 – 56 species
  - Cloeon Leach, 1815 – 82 species
  - Corinnella Thomas & Dominique, 2006 – 3 species
  - Crassabwa Lugo-Ortiz & McCafferty, 1996 – 6 species
  - Cryptonympha Lugo-Ortiz & McCafferty, 1998 – 4 species
  - Cymbalcloeon Suttinun, Gattolliat & Boonsoong, 2020 – 1 species
  - Dabulamanzia Lugo-Ortiz & McCafferty, 1996 – 11 species
  - Deceptiviosa Lugo-Ortiz & McCafferty, 1999 – 0 species
  - Delouardus Lugo-Ortiz & McCafferty, 1999 – 1 species
  - Demoreptus Lugo-Ortiz & McCafferty, 1997 – 3 species
  - Demoulinia Gillies, 1990 – 3 species
  - Dicentroptilum Wuillot & Gilli, 1994 – 6 species
  - Diphetor Waltz & McCafferty, 1987 – 1 species
  - Echinobaetis Mol, 1989 – 1 species
  - Edmulmeatus Lugo-Ortiz & McCafferty, 1997 – 1 species
  - Edmundsiops Lugo-Ortiz & McCafferty, 1999 – 2 species
  - Fallceon Waltz & McCafferty, 1987 – 19 species
  - Glossidion Lugo-Ortiz & McCafferty, 1998 – 2 species
  - Gratia Thomas, 1992 – 3 species
  - Guajirolus Flowers, 1985 – 5 species
  - Guloptiloides Gattolliat & Sartori, 2000 – 1 species
  - Harpagobaetis Mol, 1986 – 2 species
  - Herbrossus McCafferty & Lugo-Ortiz, 1998 – 3 species
  - Heterocloeon McDunnough, 1925 – 9 species
  - Indobaetis Müller-Liebenau & Morihara, 1982 – 4 species
  - Indocloeon Müller-Liebenau, 1982 – 6 species
  - Jubabaetis Müller-Liebenau, 1980 – 1 species
  - Kirmaushenkreena McCafferty, 2011 – 1 species
  - Kivuiops Lugo-Ortiz & McCafferty, 2007 – 4 species
  - Labiobaetis Novikova & Kluge, 1987 – 120 species
  - Liebebiella Waltz & McCafferty, 1987 – 10 species
  - Lugoiops McCafferty & Baumgardner, 2003 – 1 species
  - Macuxi Cruz, Salles, Hamada & Falcão, 2020 – 1 species
  - Madaechinopus Gattolliat & Jacobus, 2010 – 2 species
  - Mayobaetis Waltz & McCafferty, 1985 – 1 species
  - Megabranchiella Phlai-ngam & Tungpairojwong, 2022 – 2 species
  - Megalabiops Kaltenbach & Gattolliat, 2021 – 1 species
  - Mesobaetis Brauer, Redtenbacher & Ganglbauer, 1889 – 1 species
  - Micksiops McCafferty, Lugo-Ortiz & Barber-James, 1997 – 1 species
  - Moribaetis Waltz & McCafferty, 1985 – 9 species
  - Mutelocloeon Gillies & Elouard, 1989 – 2 species
  - Mystaxiops McCafferty & Sun, 2005 – 1 species
  - Nanomis Lugo-Ortiz & McCafferty, 1999 – 1 species
  - Nesoptiloides Demoulin, 1973 – 1 species
  - Nigrobaetis Novikova & Kluge, 1987 – 41 species
  - Offadens Lugo-Ortiz & McCafferty, 1998 – 4 species
  - Ophelmatostoma Waltz & McCafferty, 1987 – 1 species
  - Papuanatula Lugo-Ortiz & McCafferty, 1999 – 42 species
  - Paracloeodes Day, 1955 – 24 species
  - Parakari Nieto & Derka, 2011 – 3 species
  - Pedicelliops Kaltenbach & Gattolliat, 2020 – 1 species
  - Petracloeon Sroka & Gattolliat, 2025 – 1 species
  - Peuhlella Lugo-Ortiz & McCafferty, 1998 – 1 species
  - Platybaetis Müller-Liebenau, 1980 – 12 species
  - Plauditus Lugo-Ortiz & McCafferty, 1998 – 10 species
  - Potamocloeon Gillies, 1990 – 1 species
  - Prebaetodes Lugo-Ortiz & McCafferty, 1996 – 2 species
  - Procerobaetis Kaltenbach & Gattolliat, 2020 – 4 species
  - Procloeon Bengtsson, 1915 – 50 species
  - Promatsumura Hubbard, 1988 – 2 species
  - Pseudocentroptiloides Jacob, 1986 – 5 species
  - Pseudocentroptilum Bogoescu – 3 species
  - Pseudocloeon Klapalek, 1905 – 53 species
  - Pseudopannota Waltz & McCafferty, 1987 – 10 species
  - Raptobaetopus Müller-Liebenau, 1978 – 2 species
  - Rheoptilum Gattolliat, 2001 – 2 species
  - Rhithrocloeon Gillies, 1985 – 2 species
  - Rivudiva Lugo-Ortiz & McCafferty, 1998 – 11 species
  - Scutoptilum Gattolliat, 2002 – 1 species
  - Securiops Jacobus, McCafferty & Gattolliat, 2006 – 5 species
  - Skolomystax Suter, Webb & Gattolliat, 2023 – 10 species
  - Spiritiops Lugo-Ortiz & McCafferty, 1998 – 2 species
  - Susua Lugo-Ortiz & McCafferty, 1998 – 1 species
  - Symbiocloeon Müller-Liebenau, 1979 – 2 species
  - Takobia Novikova & Kluge, 1987 – 6 species
  - Tanzaniops McCafferty & Barber-James, 2005 – 3 species
  - Tenuibaetis Kang & Yang, 1994 – 9 species
  - Thraulobaetodes Elouard & Hideux, 1991 – 1 species
  - Tomedontus Lugo-Ortiz & McCafferty, 1995 – 1 species
  - Tupiara Salles, Lugo-Ortiz, Da-Silva & Francischetti, 2003 – 1 species
  - Varipes Lugo-Ortiz & McCafferty, 1998 – 6 species
  - Waltzoyphius McCafferty & Lugo-Ortiz, 1995 – 2 species
  - Waynokiops Hill, Pfeiffer & Jacobus, 2010 – 3 species
  - Xyrodromeus Lugo-Ortiz & McCafferty, 1997 – 6 species
  - Zelusia Lugo-Ortiz & McCafferty, 1998 – 1 species
- Metretopodidae Traver, 1954 – 21 species
  - Metreplecton Kluge, 1996 – 1 species
  - Metretopus Eaton, 1901 – 4 species
  - Siphloplecton Clemens, 1915 – 16 species
- Oniscigastridae Lameere, 1917 – 8 species
  - Oniscigaster McLachlan, 1873 – 3 species
  - Siphlonella Needham & Murphy, 1924 – 2 species
  - Tasmanophlebia Tillyard, 1921 – 3 species
- Siphlonuridae Banks, 1900 – 51 species
  - Edmundsius Day, 1953 – 1 species
  - Parameletus Bengtsson, 1908 – 7 species
  - Siphlonisca Needham, 1909 – 1 species
  - Siphlonurus Eaton, 1868 – 41 species
  - Siphlurella Bengtsson, 1909 – 1 species
