= List of Baetidae genera =

This is a list of 111 genera in the family Baetidae, small minnow mayflies.

== Baetidae genera ==
- Acanthiops ^{c g}
- Acentrella Bengtsson, 1912^{i c g b}
- Acerobiella ^{c g}
- Acerpenna Waltz & McCafferty, 1987^{i c g b}
- Acetrella ^{g}
- Adebrotus ^{c g}
- Adnoptilum ^{c g}
- Afrobaetodes ^{c g}
- Afroptilum ^{c g}
- Alainites ^{c g}
- Americabaetis Kluge, 1992^{i c g}
- Anafroptilum Kluge, 2011^{c g b}
- Andesiops ^{c g}
- Apobaetis Day, 1955^{i c g}
- Asiobaetodes ^{c g}
- Aturbina ^{c g}
- Baetiella Ueno, 1931^{i c g}
- Baetis Leach, 1815^{i c g b}
- Baetodes Needham and Murphy, 1924^{i c g}
- Baetopus Keffermüller, 1960^{i c g}
- Barbaetis Waltz and McCafferty, 1985^{i c g}
- Barnumus ^{c g}
- Bugilliesia ^{c g}
- Bungona ^{c g}
- Callibaetis Eaton, 1881^{i c g b}
- Camelobaetidius Demoulin, 1966^{i c g b}
- Centroptiloides ^{c g}
- Centroptilum Eaton, 1869^{i c g b}
- Chane ^{c g}
- Cheleocloeon ^{c g}
- Chopralla ^{c g}
- Cloeodes Traver, 1938^{i c g}
- Cloeon Leach, 1815^{i c g b}
- Corinnella ^{c g}
- Crassabwa ^{c g}
- Cryptonympha ^{c g}
- Cymbalcloeon Suttinun, Gattolliat & Boonsoong, 2020
- Dabulamanzia ^{c g}
- Delouardus ^{c g}
- Demoreptus ^{c g}
- Demoulinia ^{c g}
- Dicentroptilum ^{c g}
- Diphetor Waltz & McCafferty, 1987^{i c g b}
- Echinobaetis ^{c g}
- Edmulmeatus ^{c g}
- Edmundsiops ^{c g}
- Fallceon Waltz & McCafferty, 1987^{i c g b} (blue-winged olives)
- Glossidion ^{c g}
- Gratia ^{c g}
- Guajirolus Flowers, 1985^{i c g}
- Guloptiloides ^{c g}
- Harpagobaetis ^{c g}
- Herbrossus ^{c g}
- Heterocloeon McDunnough, 1925^{i c g b}
- Indobaetis ^{c g}
- Indocloeon ^{c g}
- Iswaeon McCafferty & Webb, 2005^{i b}
- Jubabaetis ^{c g}
- Kirmaushenkreena ^{c g}
- Kivuiops ^{c g}
- Labiobaetis Novikova & Kluge, 1987^{i c g b}
- Liebebiella ^{c g}
- Lugoiops McCafferty and Baumgardner, 2003^{i c g}
- Madaechinopus ^{c g}
- Mayobaetis Waltz and McCafferty, 1985^{i c g}
- Mesobaetis Brauer, Redtenbacher & Ganglbauer, 1889^{g}
- Micksiops ^{c g}
- Moribaetis Waltz and McCafferty, 1985^{i c g}
- Mutelocloeon ^{c g}
- Mystaxiops ^{c g}
- Nanomis ^{c g}
- Nesoptiloides ^{c g}
- Nigrobaetis ^{c g}
- Offadens ^{c g}
- Ophelmatostoma ^{c g}
- Palaeocloeon Kluge, 1997^{g}
- Papuanatula ^{c g}
- Paracloeodes Day, 1955^{i c g b}
- Parakari ^{c g}
- Peuhlella ^{c g}
- Platybaetis ^{c g}
- Plauditus Lugo-Ortiz & McCafferty, 1998^{i c g b}
- Prebaetodes ^{c g}
- Procloeon Bengtsson, 1915^{i c g b}
- Promatsumura ^{c g}
- Pseudocentroptiloides Jacob, 1986^{i c g}
- Pseudocentroptilum ^{c g}
- Pseudocloeon Klapalek, 1905^{i c g}
- Pseudopannota ^{c g}
- Raptobaetopus ^{c g}
- Rheoptilum ^{c g}
- Rhithrocloeon ^{c g}
- Rivudiva ^{c g}
- Scutoptilum ^{c g}
- Securiops ^{c g}
- Spiritiops ^{c g}
- Susua ^{c g}
- Symbiocloeon ^{c g}
- Takobia ^{c g}
- Tanzaniops ^{c g}
- Tenuibaetis ^{c g}
- Thraulobaetodes ^{c g}
- Tomedontus ^{c g}
- Tupiara ^{c g}
- Varipes Lugo-Ortiz and McCafferty, 1998^{i c g}
- † Vetuformosa Poinar, 2011^{g}
- Waltzohyphius Lugo-Ortiz & McCafferty, 1995^{g}
- Waltzoyphius ^{c g}
- Waynokiops ^{c g}
- Xyrodromeus ^{c g}
- Zelusia ^{c g}

Data sources: i = ITIS, c = Catalogue of Life, g = GBIF, b = Bugguide.net
