= List of mayflies of the British Isles =

List of British mayflies

This list of mayflies of the British Isles follows Macadam, with nomenclature and taxonomy according to Kluge. There are 51 species of mayfly known to occur in the British Isles.

== Species ==
The following genera and species have been recorded from ten families.

=== Ameletidae ===
- Ameletus Eaton, 1865
  - Ameletus inopinatus Eaton, 1887

=== Arthropleidae ===
- Arthroplea Bengtsson, 1908
  - Arthroplea congener Bengtsson, 1908

=== Baetidae ===
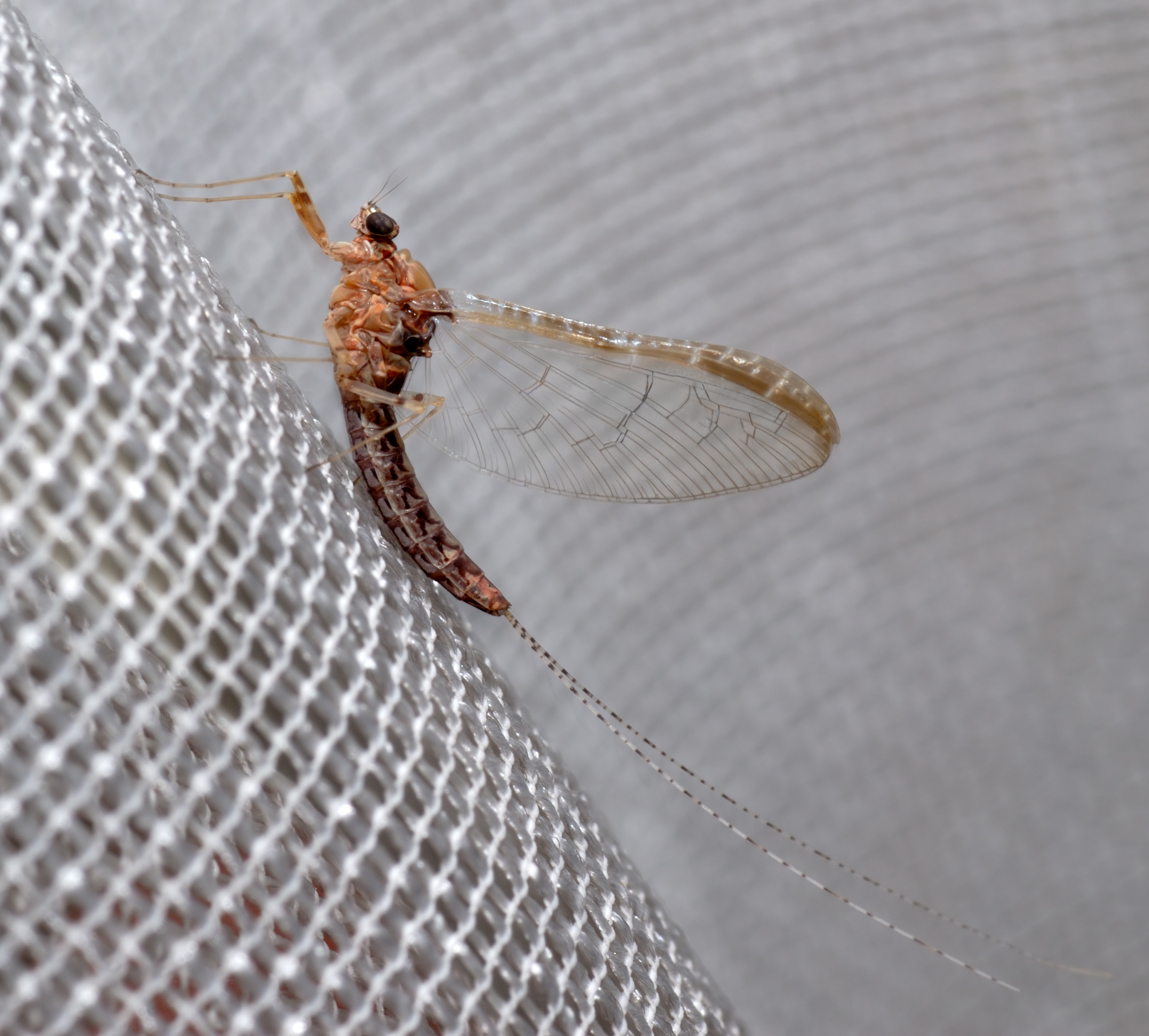
Adult

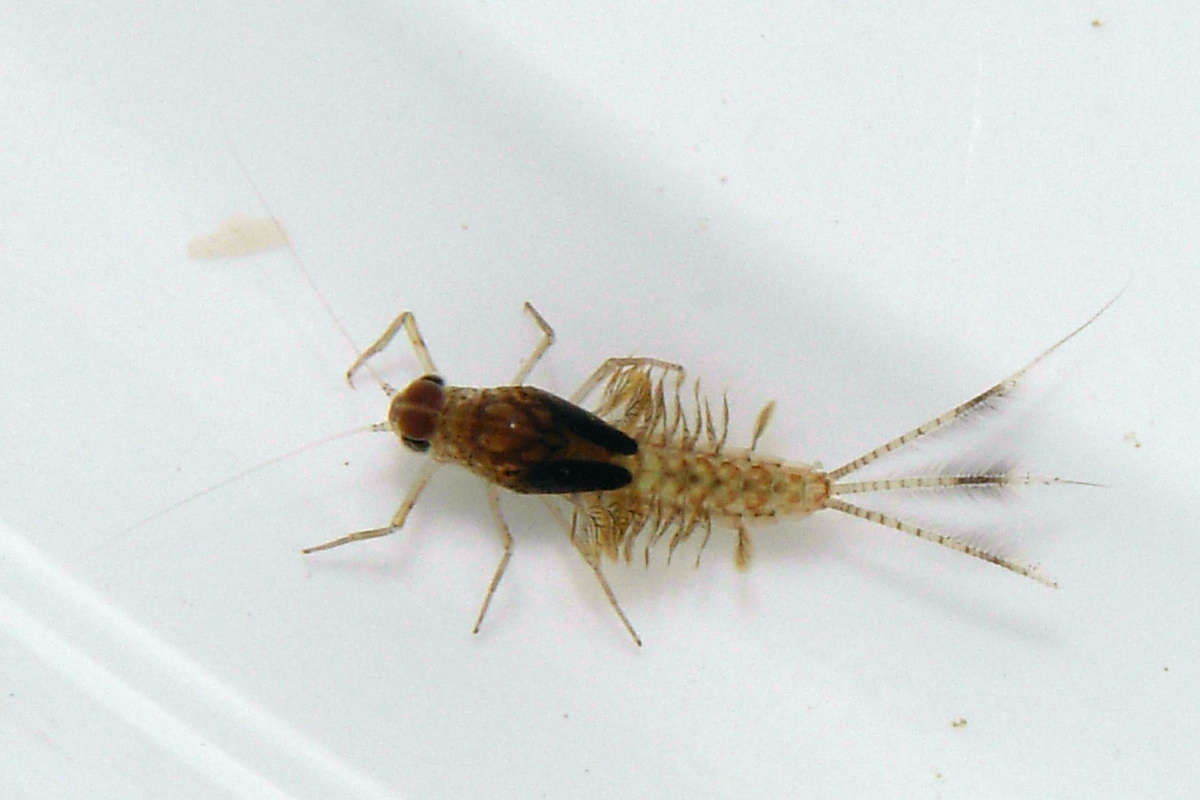
Naiad

Cloeon dipterum
- Alainites Waltz et al., 1994
  - Alainites muticus (Linnaeus, 1758)
- Baetis Leach, 1815
  - Baetis buceratus Eaton, 1870
  - Baetis fuscatus (Linnaeus, 1761)
  - Baetis rhodani (Pictet, 1843)
  - Baetis scambus Eaton, 1870
  - Baetis vernus Curtis, 1834
- Centroptilum Eaton, 1869
  - Centroptilum luteolum (Muller, 1776)
- Cloeon Leach, 1815
  - Cloeon dipterum (Linnaeus, 1761)
  - Cloeon simile Eaton, 1870
- Labiobaetis Novikova & Kluge, 1987
  - Labiobaetis atrebatinus (Eaton, 1870)
- Nigrobaetis Novikova & Kluge, 1987
  - Nigrobaetis digitatus (Bengtsson, 1919)
  - Nigrobaetis niger (Linnaeus, 1761)
- Procloeon Bengtsson, 1915
  - Procloeon bifidum (Bengtsson, 1912)
  - Procloeon pennulatum (Eaton, 1870)

=== Caenidae ===
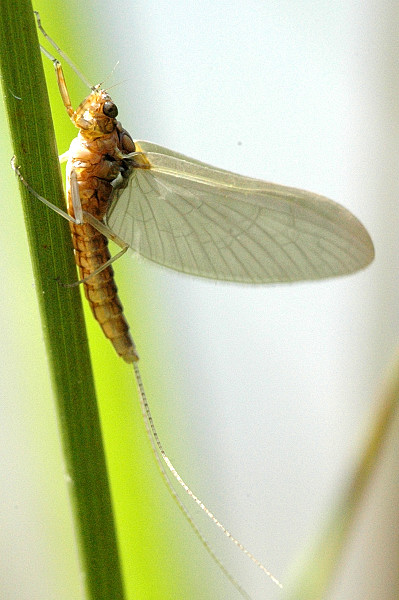
Caenis horaria

- Brachycercus Stephens, 1835
  - Brachycercus harrisella Curtis, 1834
- Caenis Curtis, 1834
  - Caenis beskidensis Sowa, 1973
  - Caenis horaria (Linnaeus, 1758)
  - Caenis luctuosa (Burmeister, 1839)
  - Caenis macrura Stephens, 1835
  - Caenis pseudorivulorum Keffermüller, 1960
  - Caenis pusilla Navás, 1913
  - Caenis rivulorum Eaton, 1884
  - Caenis robusta Eaton, 1884

=== Ephemeridae ===
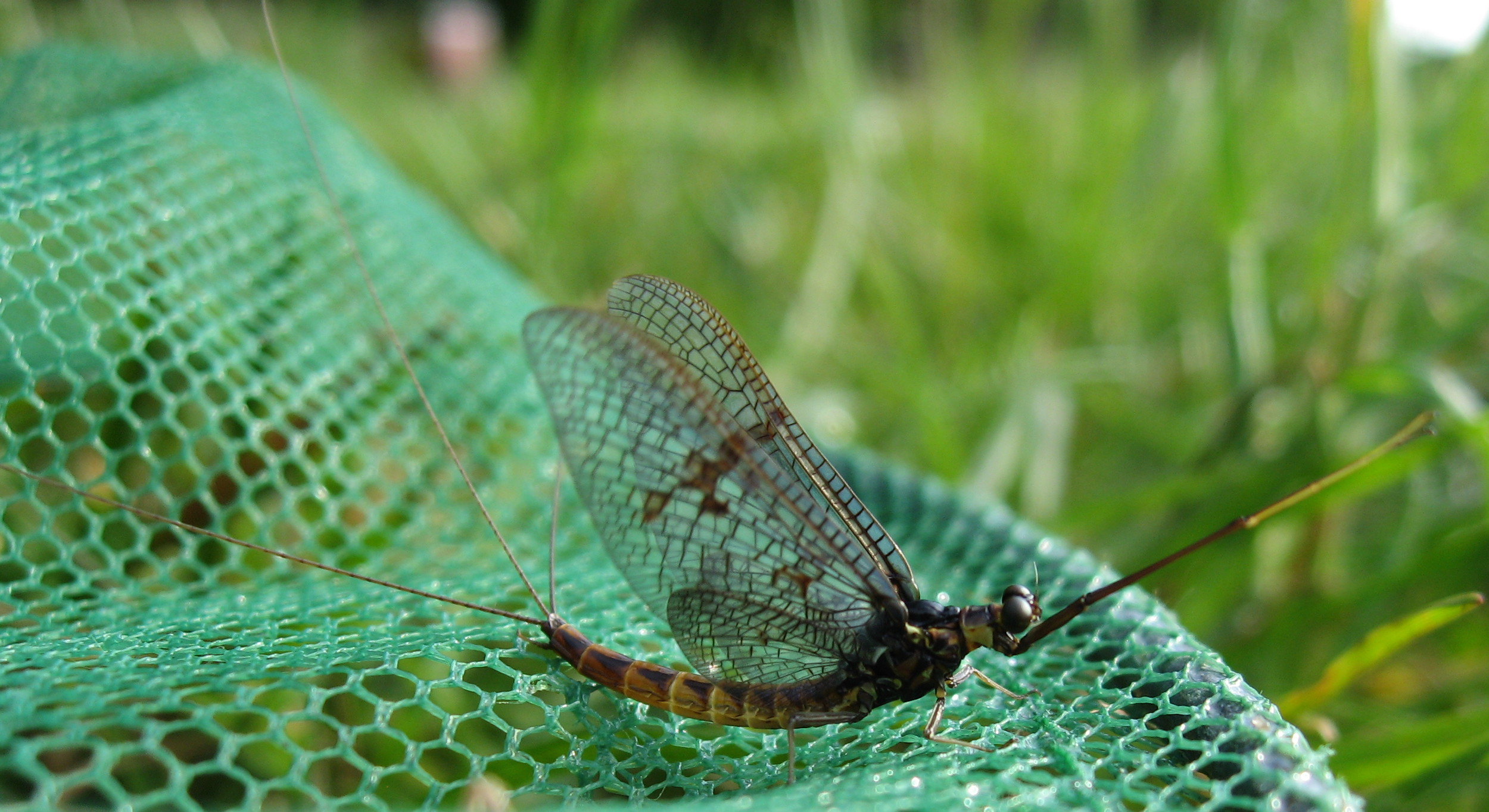
Adult

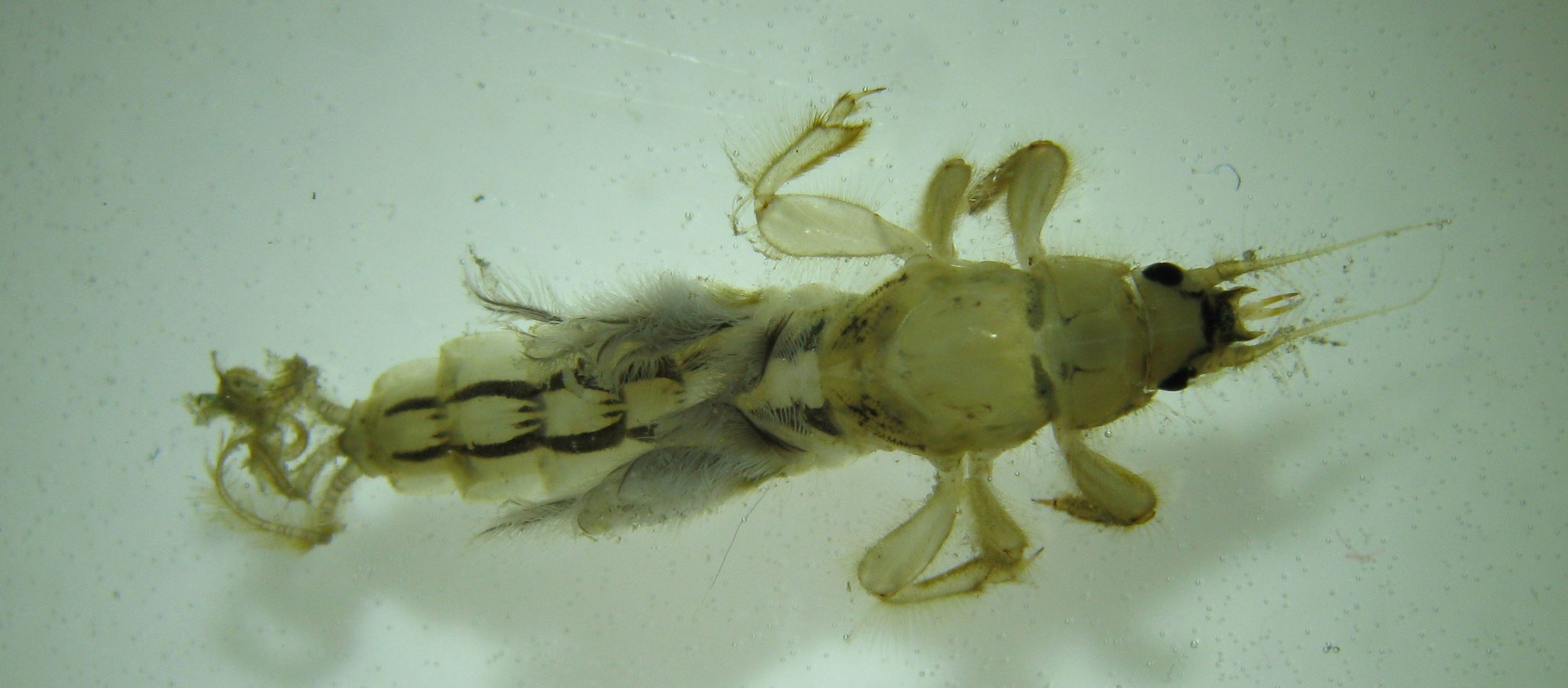
Naiad

Ephemera vulgata
- Ephemera Linnaeus, 1758
  - Ephemera danica Müller, 1764
  - Ephemera lineata Eaton, 1870
  - Ephemera vulgata Linnaeus, 1758

=== Ephemerellidae ===
- Serratella Edmunds, 1959
  - Serratella ignita (Poda, 1761)
- Ephemerella Walsh, 1862
  - Ephemerella notata Eaton, 1887

=== Heptageniidae ===
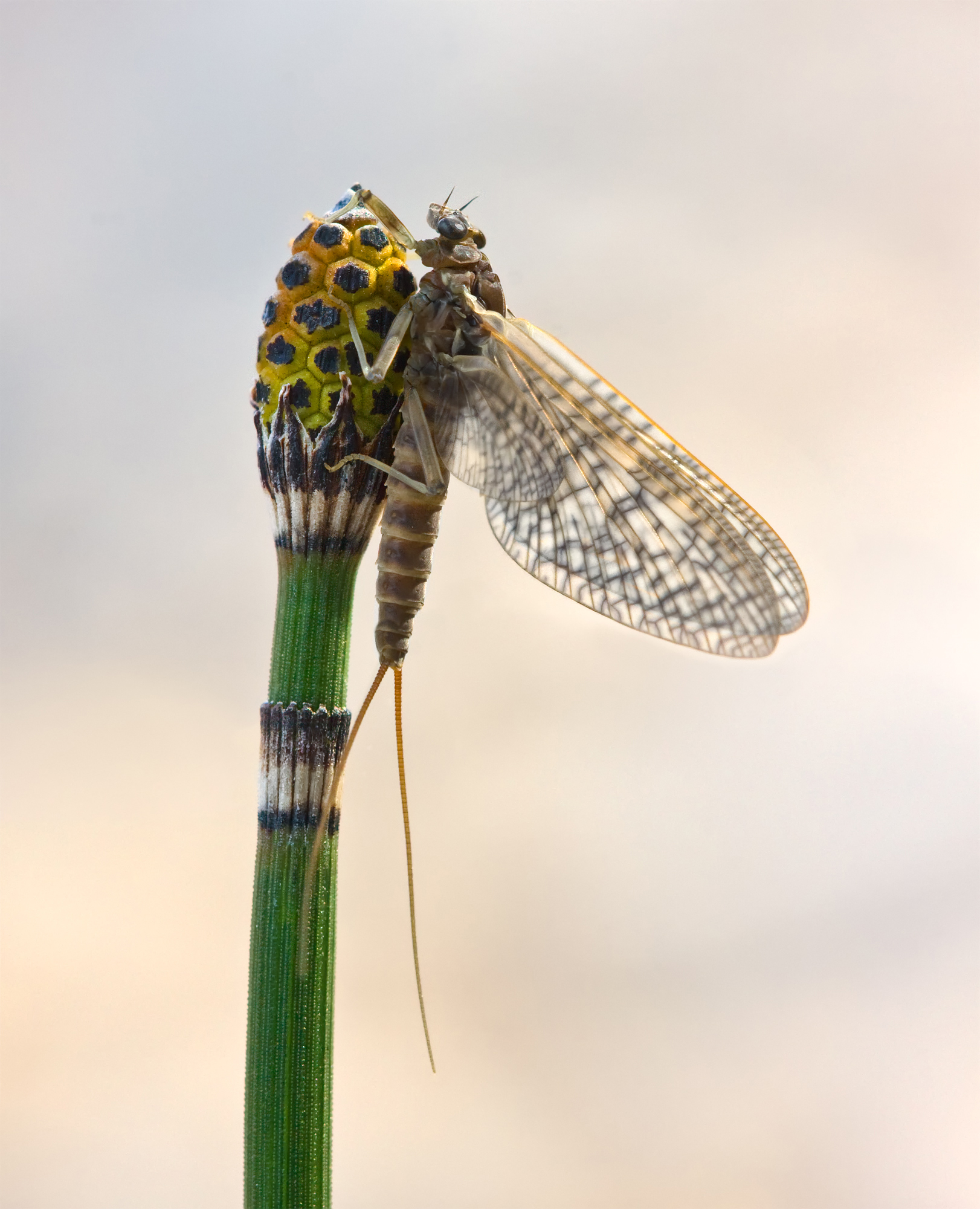
Rhithrogena germanica

- Ecdyonurus Eaton, 1868
  - Ecdyonurus dispar (Curtis, 1834)
  - Ecdyonurus insignis (Eaton, 1870)
  - Ecdyonurus torrentis Kimmins, 1942
  - Ecdyonurus venosus (Fabricius, 1775)
- Electrogena
  - Electrogena affinis (Eaton, 1870)
  - Electrogena lateralis (Curtis, 1834)
- Heptagenia Walsh, 1863
  - Heptagenia longicauda (Stephens, 1835)
  - Heptagenia sulphurea (Müller, 1764)
- Kageronia Matsumura, 1931
  - Kageronia fuscogrisea (Retzius, 1783)
- Rhithrogena Eaton, 1881
  - Rhithrogena germanica Eaton, 1870
  - Rhithrogena semicolorata (Curtis, 1834)

=== Leptophlebiidae ===
- Habrophlebia Eaton, 1881
  - Habrophlebia fusca (Curtis, 1834)
- Leptophlebia Westwood, 1840
  - Leptophlebia marginata (Linnaeus, 1767)
  - Leptophlebia vespertina (Linnaeus, 1758)
- Paraleptophlebia Lestage, 1917
  - Paraleptophlebia cincta (Retzius, 1783)
  - Paraleptophlebia submarginata (Stephens, 1835)
  - Paraleptophlebia werneri Ulmer, 1920

=== Potamanthidae ===
- Potamanthus Pictet, 1845
  - Potamanthus luteus (Linnaeus, 1767)

=== Siphlonuridae ===
- Siphlonurus Eaton, 1868
  - Siphlonurus alternatus (Say, 1824)
  - Siphlonurus armatus Eaton, 1870
  - Siphlonurus lacustris Eaton, 1870
