= Plauditus punctiventris =

Scientific classification
- Domain: Eukaryota
- Kingdom: Animalia
- Phylum: Arthropoda
- Class: Insecta
- Order: Ephemeroptera
- Family: Baetidae
- Genus: Plauditus
- Species: P. punctiventris

Binomial name
- Plauditus punctiventris (McDunnough, 1923)

Synonyms
- Cloeon punctiventris McDunnough, 1923; Pseudocloeon myrsum Burks, 1953

Species of mayfly

Plauditus punctiventris is a species of small minnow mayfly in the family Baetidae. It is found in the south half of Canada, as well as the southern and northeastern United States.
