= Camelobaetidius warreni =

Scientific classification
- Domain: Eukaryota
- Kingdom: Animalia
- Phylum: Arthropoda
- Class: Insecta
- Order: Ephemeroptera
- Family: Baetidae
- Genus: Camelobaetidius
- Species: C. warreni

Binomial name
- Camelobaetidius warreni (Traver & Edmunds, 1968)

Synonyms
- Camelobaetidius cepheus (Traver and Edmunds, 1968); Camelobaetidius navis (Allen and Chao, 1978); Camelobaetidius similis Lugo-Ortiz and McCafferty, 1995; Camelobaetidius trivialis (Allen and Chao, 1978); Camelobaetidius zenobia (Traver and Edmunds, 1968); Dactylobaetis cepheus Traver and Edmunds, 1968; Dactylobaetis navis Allen and Chao, 1978; Dactylobaetis trivialis Allen and Chao, 1978; Dactylobaetis warreni Traver and Edmunds, 1968; Dactylobaetis zenobia Traver and Edmunds, 1968

Species of mayfly

Camelobaetidius warreni is a species of small minnow mayfly in the family Baetidae. It is found in Central America and North America. In North America, its range includes southwestern Canada, all of Mexico, the northern, and southwestern United States.
