= Acentrella sinaica =

Scientific classification
- Domain: Eukaryota
- Kingdom: Animalia
- Phylum: Arthropoda
- Class: Insecta
- Order: Ephemeroptera
- Family: Baetidae
- Genus: Acentrella
- Species: A. sinaica

Binomial name
- Acentrella sinaica Bogoescu, 1931

Species of mayfly

Acentrella sinaica is a species of small minnow mayfly in the family Baetidae.
