= Acentrella charadra =

Scientific classification
- Domain: Eukaryota
- Kingdom: Animalia
- Phylum: Arthropoda
- Class: Insecta
- Order: Ephemeroptera
- Family: Baetidae
- Genus: Acentrella
- Species: A. charadra

Binomial name
- Acentrella charadra Sroka & Arnekleiv, 2010

Species of mayfly

Acentrella charadra is a species of small minnow mayfly in the family Baetidae.
