= Acentrella almohades =

Scientific classification
- Domain: Eukaryota
- Kingdom: Animalia
- Phylum: Arthropoda
- Class: Insecta
- Order: Ephemeroptera
- Family: Baetidae
- Genus: Acentrella
- Species: A. almohades

Binomial name
- Acentrella almohades Alba-Tercedor & El-Alami, 1999

Species of mayfly

Acentrella almohades is a species of small minnow mayfly in the family Baetidae.
