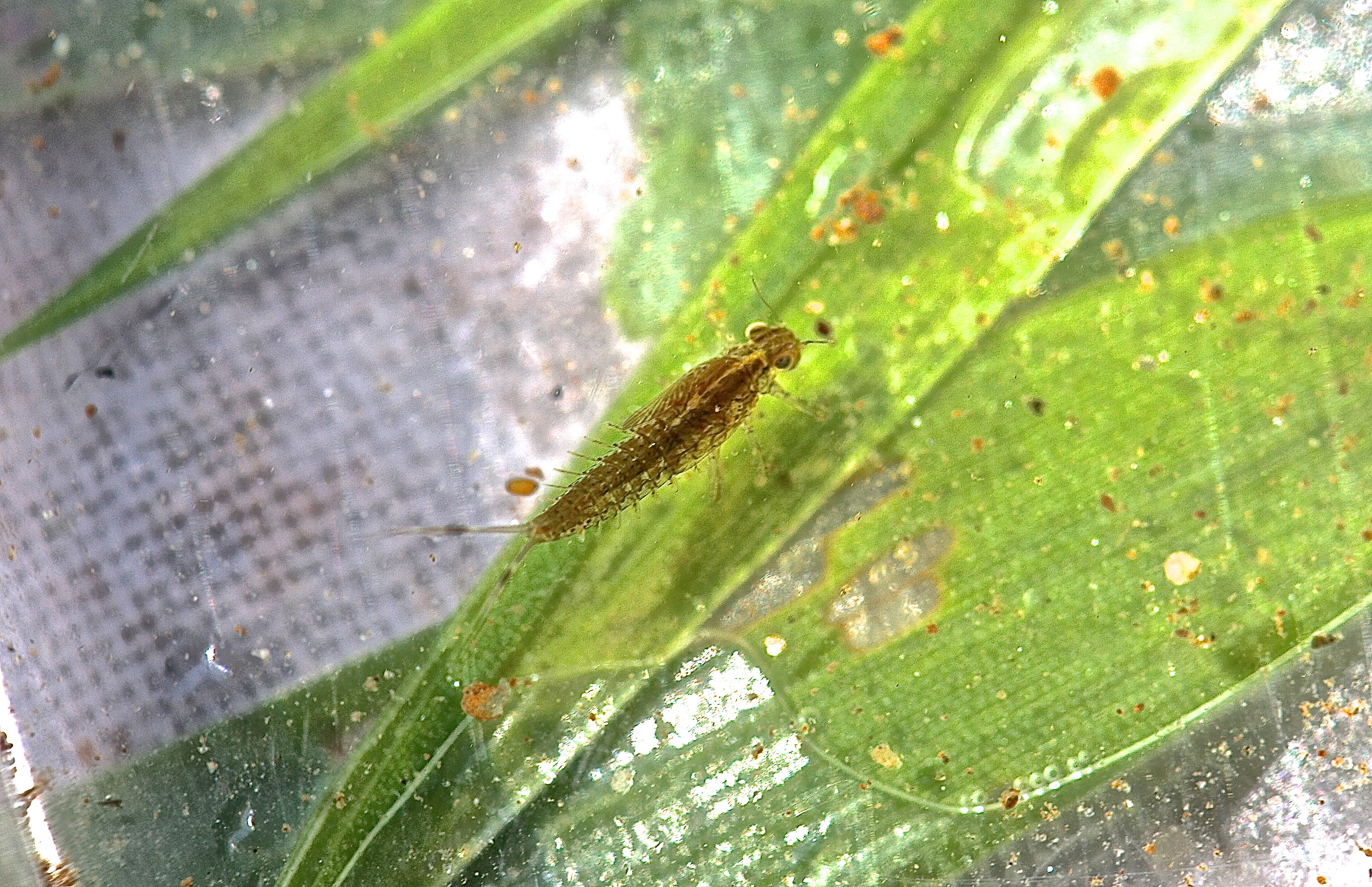

Scientific classification
- Domain: Eukaryota
- Kingdom: Animalia
- Phylum: Arthropoda
- Class: Insecta
- Order: Ephemeroptera
- Family: Baetidae
- Genus: Iswaeon
- Species: I. anoka

Binomial name
- Iswaeon anoka (Daggy, 1945)

Synonyms
- Pseudocloeon anoka Daggy, 1945; Pseudocloeon edmundsi Jensen, 1969

= Iswaeon anoka =

Species of mayfly

Iswaeon anoka is a species of small minnow mayfly in the family Baetidae.
