= Acentrella insignificans =

Scientific classification
- Domain: Eukaryota
- Kingdom: Animalia
- Phylum: Arthropoda
- Class: Insecta
- Order: Ephemeroptera
- Family: Baetidae
- Genus: Acentrella
- Species: A. insignificans

Binomial name
- Acentrella insignificans (McDunnough, 1926)

Synonyms
- Baetis insignificans McDunnough, 1926

Species of mayfly

Acentrella insignificans is a species of small minnow mayfly in the family Baetidae. It is found in Central America to North America. In North America its range includes southwestern, northern Canada, northern Mexico, the northern, southwestern United States, and Alaska.
