= Andesiops torrens =

Scientific classification
- Kingdom: Animalia
- Phylum: Arthropoda
- Class: Insecta
- Order: Ephemeroptera
- Family: Baetidae
- Genus: Andesiops
- Species: A. torrens

Binomial name
- Andesiops torrens Lugo-Ortiz & McCafferty, 1999

Species of mayfly

Andesiops torrens is a species of mayfly, commonly found in Argentina and Chile. It was first described in 1999 by Lugo-Ortiz & McCafferty. It is a part of the family Baetidae and the small genus Andesiops.
