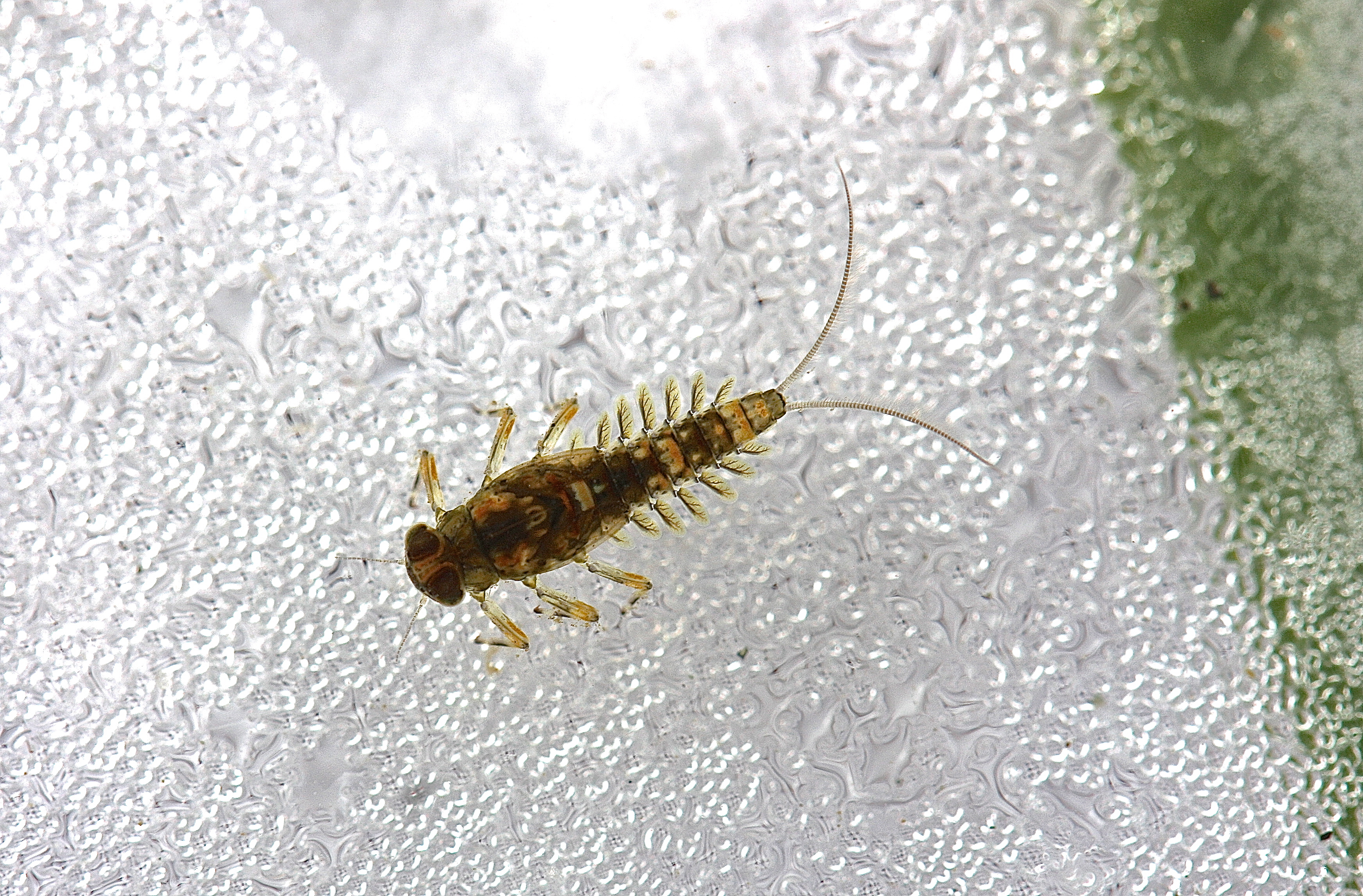

Scientific classification
- Domain: Eukaryota
- Kingdom: Animalia
- Phylum: Arthropoda
- Class: Insecta
- Order: Ephemeroptera
- Family: Baetidae
- Genus: Acentrella
- Species: A. nadineae

Binomial name
- Acentrella nadineae McCafferty, Waltz & Webb, 2009

= Acentrella nadineae =

Species of mayfly

Acentrella nadineae is a species of small minnow mayfly in the family Baetidae. It is found in the eastern United States.
