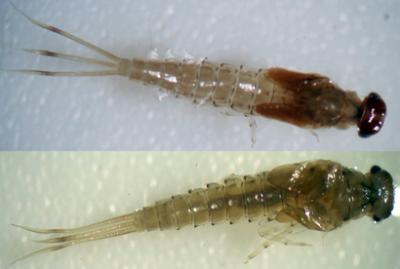
- Two L. soldani larvae

Scientific classification
- Kingdom: Animalia
- Phylum: Arthropoda
- Class: Insecta
- Order: Ephemeroptera
- Family: Baetidae
- Genus: Labiobaetis
- Species: L. soldani

Binomial name
- Labiobaetis soldani Kubendran et al., 2014

= Labiobaetis soldani =

Species of mayfly

Labiobaetis soldani is a species of mayfly found in the Tirunelveli district of India. The species was named after Dr. T. Soldan. The larvae were collected in a slow-flowing perennial stream. Larvae were light brown in coloration with yellow antennae and gills on abdominal segments 1–7. Male larvae measured 4 millimeters while female larvae measured 4.8 millimeters. Male imagoes were 5.2 millimeters, while females measured 5.0 millimeters. Both sexes had transparent forewings 3.5 millimeters long and no hind wings. Head and thorax were dark brown, with yellow legs. Males' abdomens were reddish brown or white, while females' were brown.
