= Acentrella barbarae =

Scientific classification
- Domain: Eukaryota
- Kingdom: Animalia
- Phylum: Arthropoda
- Class: Insecta
- Order: Ephemeroptera
- Family: Baetidae
- Genus: Acentrella
- Species: A. barbarae

Binomial name
- Acentrella barbarae Jacobus & McCafferty, 2006

Species of mayfly

Acentrella barbarae is a species of small minnow mayfly in the family Baetidae. It is found in North America.
