= Acentrella glareosa =

Scientific classification
- Domain: Eukaryota
- Kingdom: Animalia
- Phylum: Arthropoda
- Class: Insecta
- Order: Ephemeroptera
- Family: Baetidae
- Genus: Acentrella
- Species: A. glareosa

Binomial name
- Acentrella glareosa Sroka & Arnekleiv, 2010

Species of mayfly

Acentrella glareosa is a species of small minnow mayfly in the family Baetidae.
