= Tasmanophlebia lacuscoerulei =

Conservation status
- Endangered (IUCN 3.1)

Scientific classification
- Kingdom: Animalia
- Phylum: Arthropoda
- Class: Insecta
- Order: Ephemeroptera
- Family: Oniscigastridae
- Genus: Tasmanophlebia
- Species: T. lacuscoerulei

Binomial name
- Tasmanophlebia lacuscoerulei Tillyard, 1933

Synonyms
- Tasmanophlebi lacus-coerulei Tasmanophlebia lacus-coerulei Tillyard, 1933 [orth. error]

Species of mayfly

Tasmanophlebia lacuscoerulei is a species of mayfly in the family Siphlonuridae. It is endemic to New South Wales in Australia. It is known commonly as the large Blue Lake mayfly.

This mayfly has a limited distribution in an area of about 80 square kilometers in Kosciuszko National Park. It occurs at Blue Lake and its inlet stream, and possibly at Lakes Albina and Cootapatamba.

The species is native to the alpine climate of this area, and is likely sensitive to climate change. For this reason it was uplisted from vulnerable to endangered status by the International Union for Conservation of Nature (IUCN) in 2014.
