= Apobaetis lakota =

Scientific classification
- Domain: Eukaryota
- Kingdom: Animalia
- Phylum: Arthropoda
- Class: Insecta
- Order: Ephemeroptera
- Family: Baetidae
- Genus: Apobaetis
- Species: A. lakota

Binomial name
- Apobaetis lakota McCafferty, 2000

Species of mayfly

Apobaetis lakota is a species of small minnow mayfly in the family Baetidae. It is found in North America.
