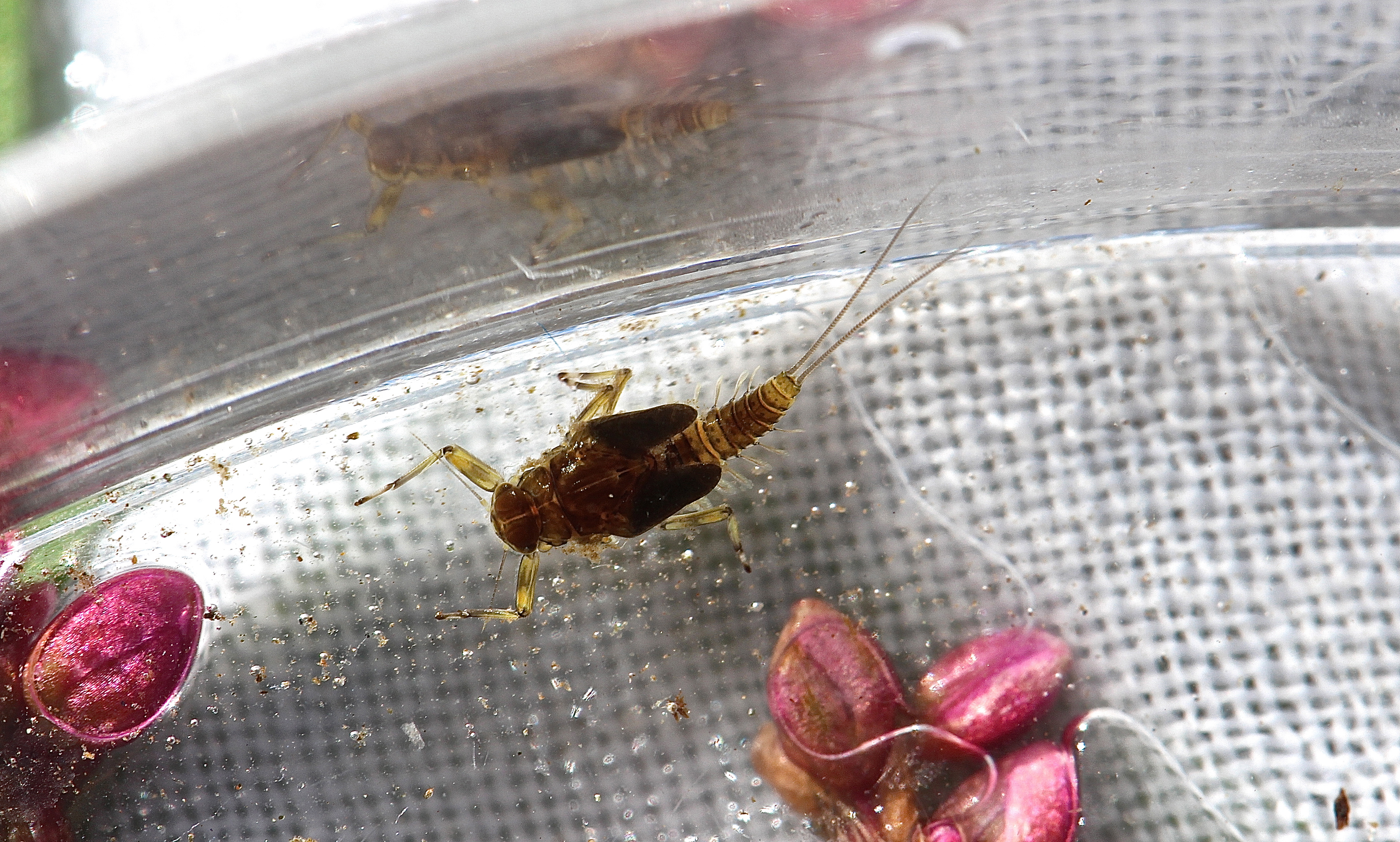

Scientific classification
- Domain: Eukaryota
- Kingdom: Animalia
- Phylum: Arthropoda
- Class: Insecta
- Order: Ephemeroptera
- Family: Baetidae
- Genus: Acentrella
- Species: A. turbida

Binomial name
- Acentrella turbida (McDunnough, 1924)

Synonyms
- Acentrella carolina (Banks, 1924); Cloeon carolina Banks, 1924; Pseudocloeon carolina (Banks, 1924); Pseudocloeon turbidum McDunnough, 1924

= Acentrella turbida =

Species of mayfly

Acentrella turbida is a species of small minnow mayfly in the family Baetidae. It is found in Central America and North America. In North America its range includes all of Canada, northern Mexico, and at least 43 of the 50 states within the United States, including Alaska No common name has been given to this insect, but is it generically referred to as a mayfly as it is one of 3000 species of mayfly.
