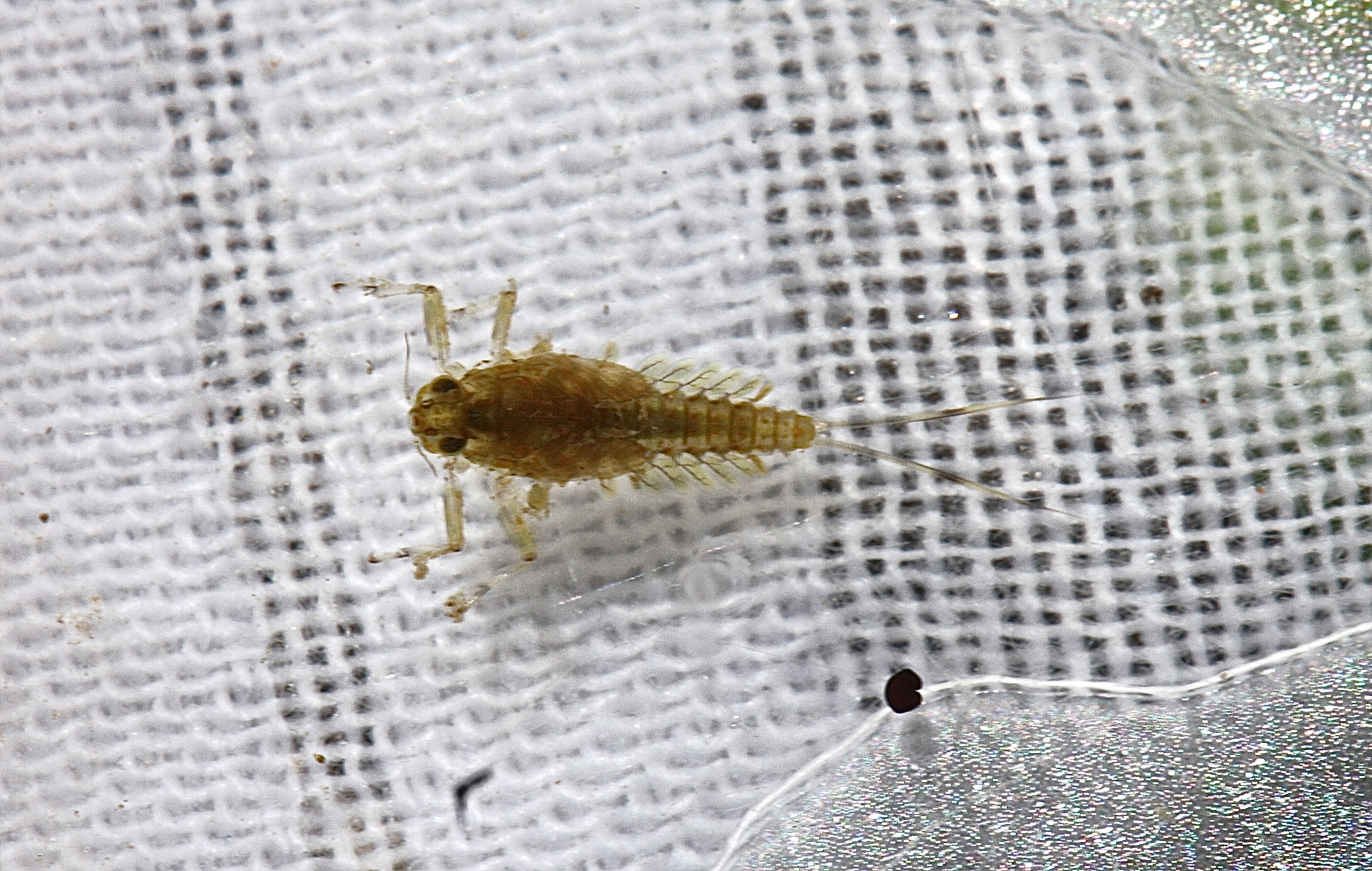

Scientific classification
- Domain: Eukaryota
- Kingdom: Animalia
- Phylum: Arthropoda
- Class: Insecta
- Order: Ephemeroptera
- Family: Baetidae
- Genus: Plauditus
- Species: P. dubius

Binomial name
- Plauditus dubius (Walsh, 1862)

Synonyms
- Cloe dubia Walsh, 1862; Cloeon chlorops McDunnough, 1923; Pseudocloeon chlorops (McDunnough, 1923)

= Plauditus dubius =

Species of mayfly

Plauditus dubius is a species of small minnow mayfly in the family Baetidae. It is found in all of Canada, the northern, southeastern United States, and Alaska.
