= Apobaetis futilis =

Scientific classification
- Domain: Eukaryota
- Kingdom: Animalia
- Phylum: Arthropoda
- Class: Insecta
- Order: Ephemeroptera
- Family: Baetidae
- Genus: Apobaetis
- Species: A. futilis

Binomial name
- Apobaetis futilis (McDunnough, 1931)

Species of mayfly

Apobaetis futilis is a species of small minnow mayfly in the family Baetidae. It is found in North America.
