= Acentrella inexpectata =

Scientific classification
- Domain: Eukaryota
- Kingdom: Animalia
- Phylum: Arthropoda
- Class: Insecta
- Order: Ephemeroptera
- Family: Baetidae
- Genus: Acentrella
- Species: A. inexpectata

Binomial name
- Acentrella inexpectata (Tshernova, 1928)

Species of mayfly

Acentrella inexpectata is a species of small minnow mayfly in the family Baetidae. It is found in Europe and Northern Asia (excluding China).
