= Baetodes adustus =

Scientific classification
- Domain: Eukaryota
- Kingdom: Animalia
- Phylum: Arthropoda
- Class: Insecta
- Order: Ephemeroptera
- Family: Baetidae
- Genus: Baetodes
- Species: B. adustus

Binomial name
- Baetodes adustus Cohen & Allen, 1972

Species of mayfly

Baetodes adustus is a species of small minnow mayfly in the family Baetidae. It is found in Central America.
