= Apobaetis etowah =

Scientific classification
- Domain: Eukaryota
- Kingdom: Animalia
- Phylum: Arthropoda
- Class: Insecta
- Order: Ephemeroptera
- Family: Baetidae
- Genus: Apobaetis
- Species: A. etowah

Binomial name
- Apobaetis etowah (Traver, 1935)

Species of small minnow mayfly

Apobaetis etowah is a species of small minnow mayfly in the family Baetidae. It is found in Central America and North America.
