= Paracloeodes minutus =

Scientific classification
- Kingdom: Animalia
- Phylum: Arthropoda
- Class: Insecta
- Order: Ephemeroptera
- Family: Baetidae
- Genus: Paracloeodes
- Species: P. minutus

Binomial name
- Paracloeodes minutus (Daggy, 1945)

Synonyms
- Paracloeodes abditus Day, 1955; Pseudocloeon minutum Daggy, 1945

Species of mayfly

Paracloeodes minutus is a species of small minnow mayfly in the family Baetidae. It is found in Central America and North America. In North America its range includes southeastern Canada, northern Mexico, and the continental United States.
