= Apobaetis signifer =

Scientific classification
- Domain: Eukaryota
- Kingdom: Animalia
- Phylum: Arthropoda
- Class: Insecta
- Order: Ephemeroptera
- Family: Baetidae
- Genus: Apobaetis
- Species: A. signifer

Binomial name
- Apobaetis signifer Lugo-Ortiz & McCafferty, 1997

Species of mayfly

Apobaetis signifer is a species of small minnow mayfly in the family Baetidae.
