= Apobaetis fiuzai =

Scientific classification
- Domain: Eukaryota
- Kingdom: Animalia
- Phylum: Arthropoda
- Class: Insecta
- Order: Ephemeroptera
- Family: Baetidae
- Genus: Apobaetis
- Species: A. fiuzai

Binomial name
- Apobaetis fiuzai Salles & Lugo-Ortiz, 2002

Species of mayfly

Apobaetis fiuzai is a species of small minnow mayfly in the family Baetidae.
