= Iswaeon =

Scientific classification
- Domain: Eukaryota
- Kingdom: Animalia
- Phylum: Arthropoda
- Class: Insecta
- Order: Ephemeroptera
- Family: Baetidae
- Genus: Iswaeon; McCafferty & Webb, 2005

Genus of mayflies

Iswaeon is a genus of small minnow mayflies in the family Baetidae. There are at least three described species in Iswaeon.

== Species ==
These three species belong to the genus Iswaeon:

- Iswaeon anoka (Daggy, 1945)
- Iswaeon davidi (Waltz & McCafferty, 2005)
- Iswaeon rubrolaterale (McDunnough, 1931)
