= Tasmanophlebia =

Scientific classification
- Domain: Eukaryota
- Kingdom: Animalia
- Phylum: Arthropoda
- Class: Insecta
- Order: Ephemeroptera
- Family: Oniscigastridae
- Genus: Tasmanophlebia; Tillyard, 1921

Genus of insects

Tasmanophlebia is a genus of insects in the family Oniscigastridae.

It contains the following species:

- Tasmanophlebia lacuscoerulei
- Tasmanophlebia lacustris
- Tasmanophlebia lotis
- Tasmanophlebia nigrescens
