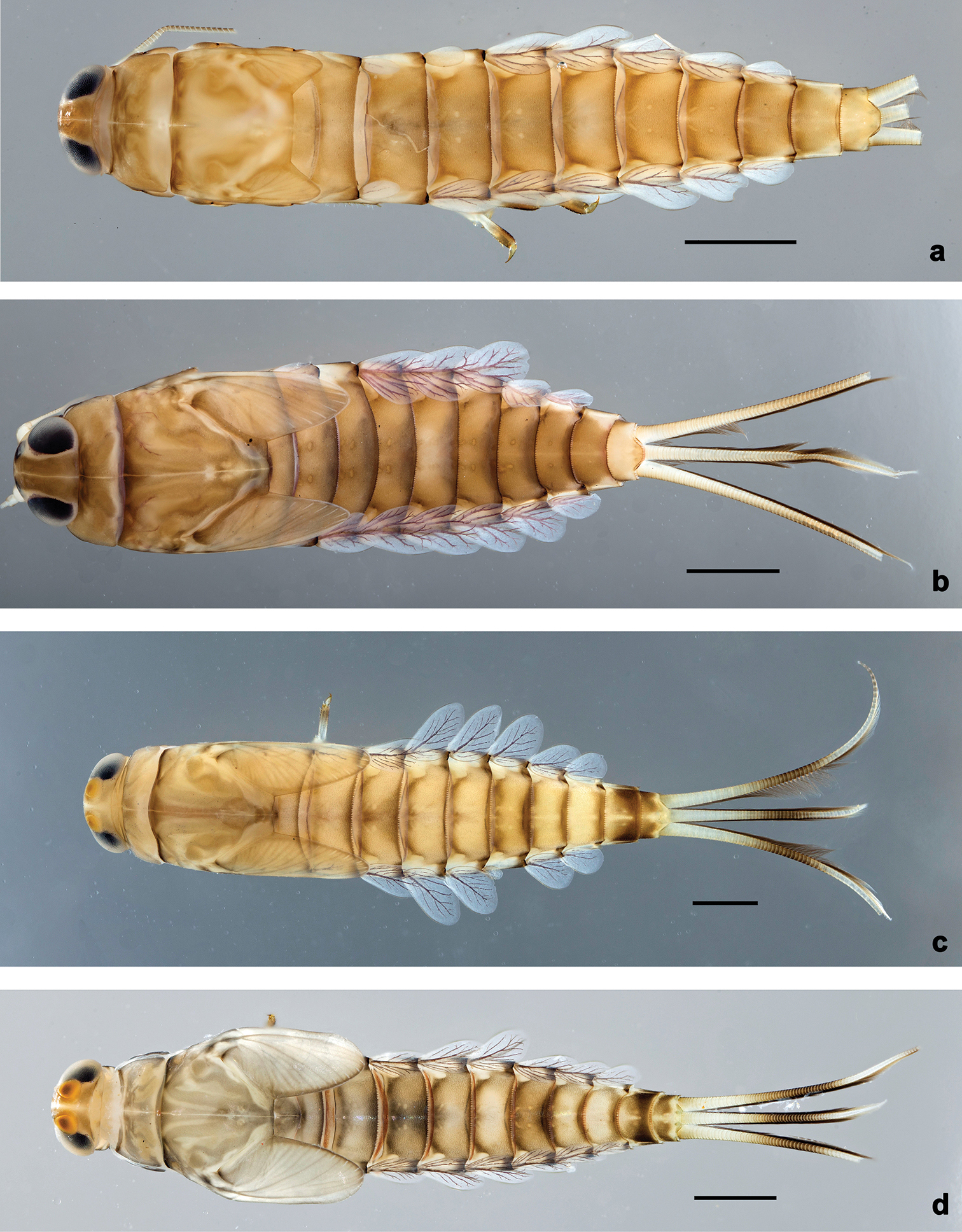
- Habitus, larvae, dorsal view of a Branchiobaetis aduncus b Branchiobaetis hamatus c Branchiobaetis joachimi (Sumatra, volcano Sago) d Branchiobaetis joachimi (Sumatra, Bukit Barisan, above Padang)

Scientific classification
- Kingdom: Animalia
- Phylum: Arthropoda
- Clade: Pancrustacea
- Class: Insecta
- Order: Ephemeroptera
- Family: Baetidae
- Genus: Branchiobaetis; Kaltenbach, Kluge & Gattolliat, 2022

Type species
- Branchiobaetis javanicus (Ulmer, 1913)

= Branchiobaetis =

Genus of mayflies

Branchiobaetis is a genus of small mayflies in the family Baetidae. First formally described in late 2022, these aquatic insects are broadly distributed across Southeast Asia—with recent records extending into East Asia—and are primarily distinguished by highly specialized respiratory adaptations in their larval stages. Species within this genus serve as important biological indicators for local water quality and riparian ecosystem health as they are dependent on highly oxygenated freshwater streams during their nymphal development.

== Taxonomy ==
The genus Branchiobaetis was erected by entomologists Thomas Kaltenbach, Nikita J. Kluge, and Jean-Luc Gattolliat in a comprehensive phylogenetic and morphological study published in the journal ZooKeys in 2022.

The establishment of the genus involved re-examining historical type material of two Southeast Asian species previously placed within the large, historically "catch-all" genus Baetis (B. javanicus and B. sabahensis), alongside the description of several entirely new species. The prefix of the genus name, Branchio-, is derived from the Greek word for "gill," referencing the unique accessory gills present on the larvae, combined with Baetis, the type genus of the family.

=== List of species ===
The genus currently contains several valid species discovered in multiple countries across Asia such as Malaysia, Indonesia, Philippines, and China.

- Branchiobaetis javanicus (Ulmer, 1913) – Type species (Java, Bali, Sumatra, Lombok)
- Branchiobaetis sabahensis (Müller-Liebenau, 1984) (Sabah, Borneo)
- Branchiobaetis aduncus Kaltenbach, Kluge & Gattolliat, 2022
- Branchiobaetis hamatus Kaltenbach, Kluge & Gattolliat, 2022
- Branchiobaetis joachimi Kaltenbach, Kluge & Gattolliat, 2022
- Branchiobaetis minangkabau Kaltenbach, Kluge & Gattolliat, 2022
- Branchiobaetis jhoanae Kaltenbach, Kluge & Gattolliat, 2022 (Philippines)
- Branchiobaetis borealis Tong, Zhou & Wu, 2024 (China)
- Branchiobaetis megasinus Tong, Zhou & Wu, 2024 (China)

== Description ==
Like all mayflies (order Ephemeroptera), species within the genus Branchiobaetis undergo incomplete metamorphosis featuring four distinct life stages: egg, aquatic larva (often called a nymph or naiad), a winged but sexually immature subimago, and the final reproductive adult (imago). Because they transition from a fully aquatic environment to a brief terrestrial one, their morphology changes drastically between these stages.

=== Larval stage ===
The larvae of Branchiobaetis are highly distinct from closely related baetids, primarily due to their highly specialized respiratory morphology. They possess prominent accessory gills located ventrally near the forecoxae (the base of the front legs) and at the base of the maxillae (mouthparts). The genus name Branchiobaetis (meaning "gilled Baetis") is a direct reference to these specific structures.

In addition to the accessory gills, the nymphs feature a unique, bubble-like membranous swelling located between the coxa and pleurite, which contains branches of tracheae that provide supplementary oxygen exchange. Their bodies are well-adapted for clinging to substrates in fast-flowing water, featuring stout setae (bristles) on their mouthparts, very slender legs, and specialized comb-like structures on their mandibles used for grazing.

=== Subimago and imago stages ===
Mayflies are unique among modern winged insects for having a subimago stage—a fully winged, flying form that must molt one final time to become a sexually mature imago.

While the adult terrestrial stages of Branchiobaetis are not as extensively documented as the aquatic larvae, adult males are characterized by the highly peculiar, folded structure of their gonostyli (clasping organs used to hold the female during mating). In Branchiobaetis, the second segment of the gonostylus is directed medially-posteriorly, while the third apical segment is bent laterally. This distinct folding structure is so prominent that it can actually be seen developing under the cuticle of male nymphs during their final larval instar. Furthermore, male adults possess highly developed, upward-facing "turbinate" eyes located on top of their heads, an evolutionary adaptation used to spot female silhouettes flying in mating swarms above them.

== Behavior and ecology ==
The nymphs are entirely aquatic and predominantly rheophilic, typically inhabiting clean, running freshwater streams and rivers. In these environments, they graze on epilithic algae and organic detritus. Their complex respiratory adaptations—specifically the supplementary coxal and maxillary gills—suggest an evolutionary optimization for oxygen uptake, making them sensitive to aquatic hypoxia. Consequently, their presence is a strong indicator of unpolluted, well-oxygenated freshwater habitats.
