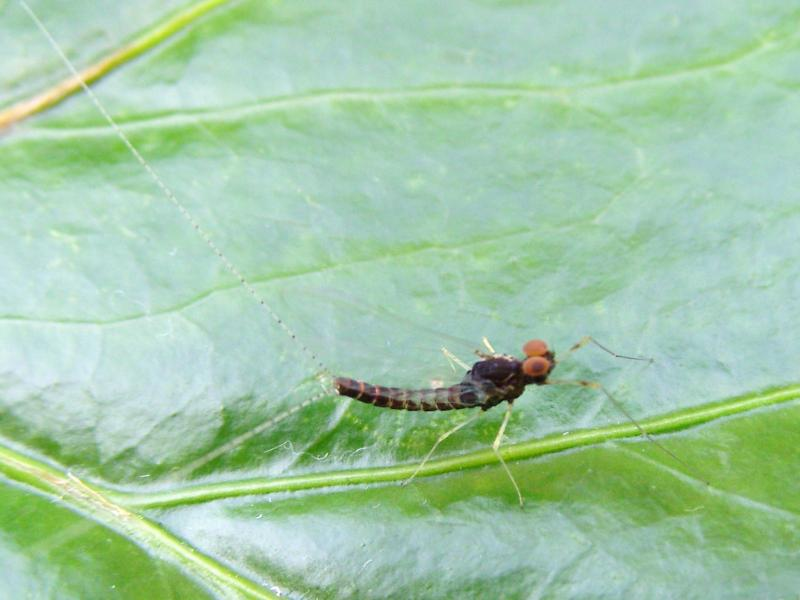
- Centroptilum luteolum

Scientific classification
- Domain: Eukaryota
- Kingdom: Animalia
- Phylum: Arthropoda
- Class: Insecta
- Order: Ephemeroptera
- Family: Baetidae
- Genus: Centroptilum
- Species: C. luteolum

Binomial name
- Centroptilum luteolum Müller, 1776

= Centroptilum luteolum =

Species of mayfly

Centroptilum luteolum is a species of small minnow mayfly in the family Baetidae. It is found in Europe.
