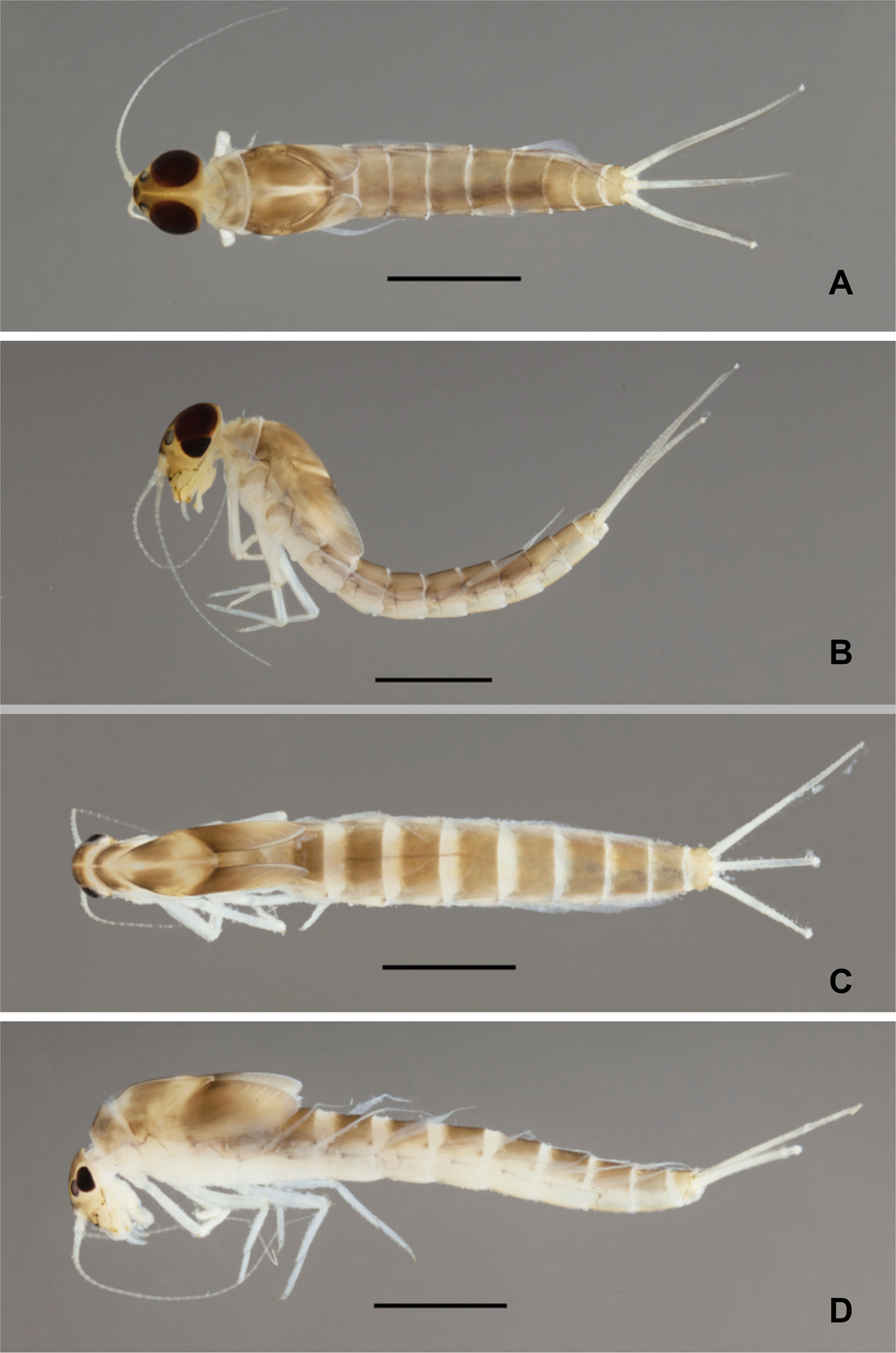
- Procerobaetis totuspinosus larvae (A dorsal view, male B lateral view, male C dorsal view, female D lateral view, female.) Scale bars: 1 mm.

Scientific classification
- Domain: Eukaryota
- Kingdom: Animalia
- Phylum: Arthropoda
- Class: Insecta
- Order: Ephemeroptera
- Family: Baetidae
- Genus: Procerobaetis; Kaltenbach & Gattolliat, 2020

= Procerobaetis =

Mayfly genus

Procerobaetis is a genus of the Baetidae, a family of mayflies that include around 1000 described species and 110 genera worldwide. Mayflies of this genus notably hatch between spring to autumn, and then die within a few minutes to a day.

== Etymology ==
Procerobaetis is a combination of Procero – the Latin word describing length, in reference to the elongate, slender habitus of the larvae – and baetis to highlight its superficial similarities with the genus Baetis.

== Taxonomy ==
The genus Procerobaetis was described in the 612th edition of the European Journal of Taxonomy with the type species of Procerobaetis leptobranchius. They belong to the Baetidae family.

== Species ==
Information referenced from the GBIF database.

1. Procerobactis leptobranchius Kaltenbach & Gattolliat, 2020
2. Procerobactis petersorum Kaltenbach & Gattolliat, 2020
3. Procerobactis freitagi Kaltenbach & Gattolliat, 2020
4. Procerobaetis totuspinosus Kaltenbach & Gattolliat, 2020

Genetic distances (Kimura 2-parameter) between these species are between 13% and 20%. Very limited genetic distances of 0% to 1% were found between specimens of the same species.

== Morphology ==
Procerobaeitis larvae are distinguished by their elongate, dorsoventrally flattened bodies and hypognathous heads. Key features include:

- Antennae with lanceolate spines on flagellar segments IX–XI.
- Gills I–VII, all slender with elongated apical points (most pronounced in gills I–II).
- Three-segmented maxillary palps (unusual in Baetidae) and mandibles with unique prosthecae.
- Legs bearing laterally pectinate setae and denticulate claws.
- Tergites I–VII typically lack posterior spines (except in P. freitagi and P. totuspinosus).

The genus is defined by its gill morphology, resembling some Leptophlebidae, and lacks hindwing pads.

== Distribution and habitat ==
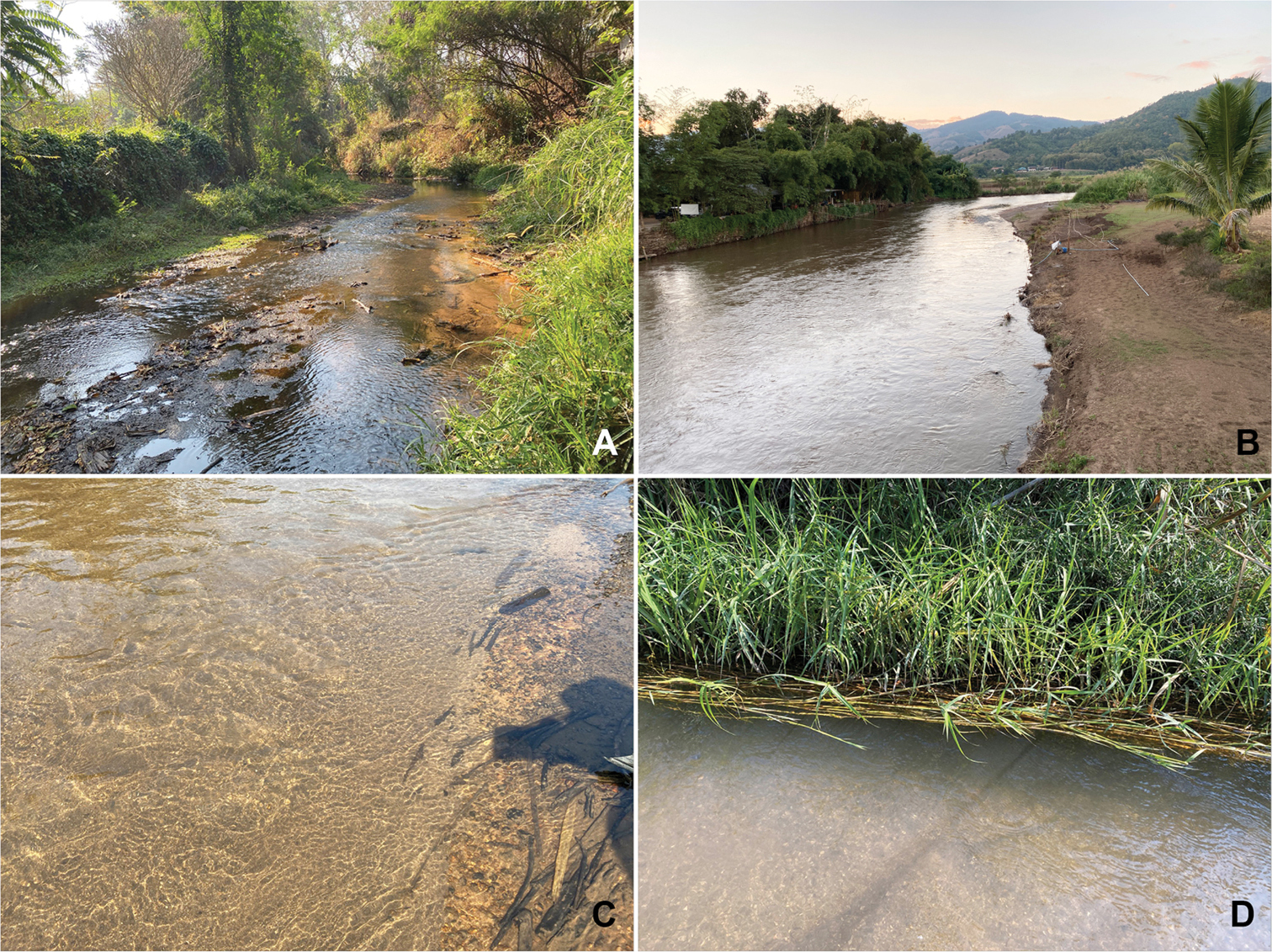
Habitats of Procerobaetis totuspinosus sp. nov. larva (A Mae Sa stream B Mae Chaem wadeable river C submerged woods with bottom sand and gravel D riverbank with vegetation and root)

Procerobaetis species are typically found in freshwater habitats such as streams and wadeable rivers, often in areas with submerged wood, sand, and gravel substrates. The larvae are typically found in littoral zones with vegetation and roots along riverbanks.

Procerobaetis species are distributed across Southeast Asia, from Indonesia (Sumatra) to the Philippines. Despite the genetic diversity of the Baetidae family, there are very few described genus and species in the oriental regions, suggesting a lack of exploration of these regions in terms of documenting the Baetidae. It is expected that a much wider distribution of more species of this genus occur across Southeast Asia that have yet to be sampled.
