= Chane (mayfly) =

Scientific classification
- Domain: Eukaryota
- Kingdom: Animalia
- Phylum: Arthropoda
- Class: Insecta
- Order: Ephemeroptera
- Family: Baetidae
- Genus: Chane

Genus of mayflies

Chane is a genus of small minnow mayflies in the family Baetidae. There is at least one described species in Chane, C. baure.
