= Apobaetis =

Scientific classification
- Kingdom: Animalia
- Phylum: Arthropoda
- Clade: Pancrustacea
- Class: Insecta
- Order: Ephemeroptera
- Family: Baetidae
- Genus: Apobaetis

Species
- 6 recognized species, see article.

Genus of mayflies

Apobaetis is a genus of mayflies in the family Baetidae. It contains at least six species.

== Species ==
- Apobaetis etowah
- Apobaetis fiuzai
- Apobaetis futilis, western hatch.
- Apobaetis indeprensus
- Apobaetis lakota
- Apobaetis signifer

et al.
