= Diphetor =

Scientific classification
- Kingdom: Animalia
- Phylum: Arthropoda
- Class: Insecta
- Order: Ephemeroptera
- Family: Baetidae
- Genus: Diphetor; Waltz & McCafferty, 1987

Type species
- Baetis hageni Eton, 1885

Genus of mayflies

Diphetor is a genus of mayflies in the family Baetidae,
