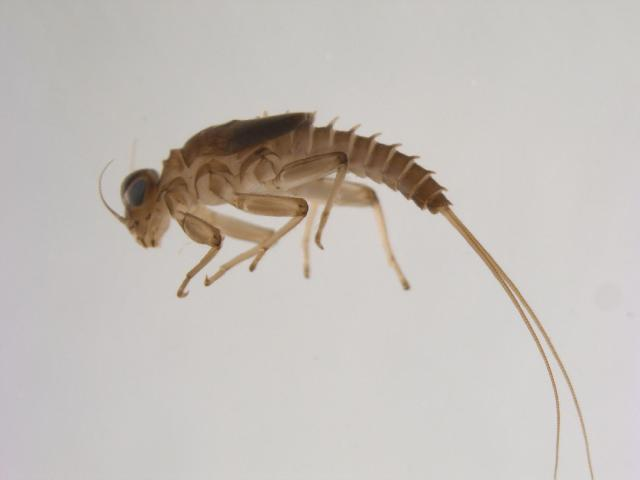
- Gratia narumonae

Scientific classification
- Domain: Eukaryota
- Kingdom: Animalia
- Phylum: Arthropoda
- Class: Insecta
- Order: Ephemeroptera
- Family: Baetidae
- Genus: Gratia

= Gratia (mayfly) =

Genus of mayflies

Gratia is a genus of small minnow mayflies in the family Baetidae. There are at least two described species in Gratia.

== Species ==
These two species belong to the genus Gratia:

- Gratia narumonae Boonsong, Thomas & Sangpradub, 2002^{c g}
- Gratia sororculaenadinae Thomas, 1992^{c g}

Data sources: i = ITIS, c = Catalogue of Life, g = GBIF, b = Bugguide.net
