= Plauditus =

Scientific classification
- Domain: Eukaryota
- Kingdom: Animalia
- Phylum: Arthropoda
- Class: Insecta
- Order: Ephemeroptera
- Family: Baetidae
- Genus: Plauditus; Lugo-Ortiz & McCafferty, 1998

Genus of mayflies

Plauditus is a genus of small minnow mayflies in the family Baetidae. There are about 10 described species in Plauditus.

== Species ==
These 10 species belong to the genus Plauditus:

- Plauditus bimaculatus (Berner, 1946)
- Plauditus cestus (Provonsha & McCafferty, 1982)
- Plauditus cingulatus (McDunnough, 1931)
- Plauditus dubius (Walsh, 1862)
- Plauditus elliotti (Daggy, 1945)
- Plauditus gloveri (McCafferty & Waltz, 1998)
- Plauditus punctiventris (McDunnough, 1923)
- Plauditus texanus (Wiersema, 1999)
- Plauditus veteris (McDunnough, 1924)
- Plauditus virilis (McDunnough, 1923)
