= Paracloeodes =

Scientific classification
- Domain: Eukaryota
- Kingdom: Animalia
- Phylum: Arthropoda
- Class: Insecta
- Order: Ephemeroptera
- Family: Baetidae
- Genus: Paracloeodes; Day, 1955

Genus of mayflies

Paracloeodes is a genus of small minnow mayflies in the family Baetidae. There are at least 20 described species in Paracloeodes.

== Species ==
These 21 species belong to the genus Paracloeodes:

- Paracloeodes assu Nieto & Salles, 2006^{c g}
- Paracloeodes atroari Nieto & Salles, 2006^{c g}
- Paracloeodes binodulus Lugo-Ortiz & McCafferty, 1996^{c g}
- Paracloeodes caldensis^{g}
- Paracloeodes charrua Emmerich & Nieto, 2009^{c g}
- Paracloeodes eurybranchus Lugo-Ortiz & McCafferty, 1996^{c g}
- Paracloeodes fleeki McCafferty and Lenat, 2004^{i c g}
- Paracloeodes ibicui Lugo-Ortiz & McCafferty, 1996^{c g}
- Paracloeodes leptobranchus Lugo-Ortiz & McCafferty, 1996^{c g}
- Paracloeodes lilliputian Kluge, 1991^{c g}
- Paracloeodes lotor^{g}
- Paracloeodes lugoi Randolph and McCafferty, 2000^{i c g}
- Paracloeodes minutus (Daggy, 1945)^{i c g b}
- Paracloeodes morellii Emmerich & Nieto, 2009^{c g}
- Paracloeodes pacawara Nieto & Salles, 2006^{c g}
- Paracloeodes peri Nieto & Salles, 2006^{c g}
- Paracloeodes poranga (Salles & Lugo-Ortiz, 2003)^{c g}
- Paracloeodes portoricensis (Traver, 1938)^{i c g}
- Paracloeodes quadridentatus Lima & Salles, 2010^{c g}
- Paracloeodes waimiri Nieto & Salles, 2006^{c g}
- Paracloeodes yuto Nieto & Salles, 2006^{c g}

Data sources: i = ITIS, c = Catalogue of Life, g = GBIF, b = Bugguide.net
