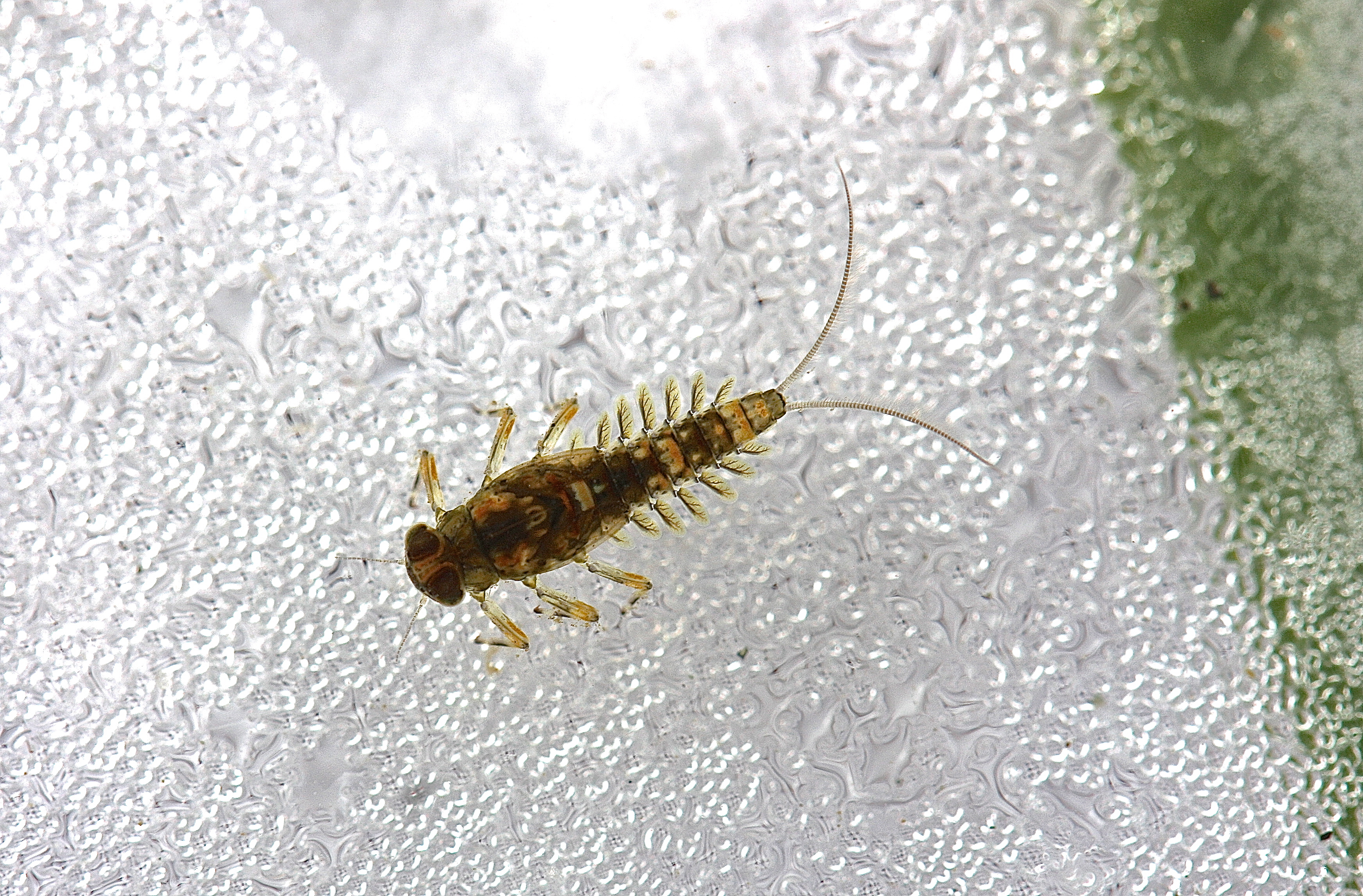
- Acentrella nadineae

Scientific classification
- Kingdom: Animalia
- Phylum: Arthropoda
- Clade: Pancrustacea
- Class: Insecta
- Order: Ephemeroptera
- Family: Baetidae
- Genus: Acentrella; Bengtsson, 1912

= Acentrella =

Genus of mayflies

Acentrella is a genus of small minnow mayflies in the family Baetidae. Species of Acentrella are recorded from Europe, North America and Asia, with a few from Africa.

== Species ==
These 26 species belong to the genus Acentrella:

- Acentrella alachua (Berner, 1940)^{i c g}
- Acentrella almohades Alba-Tercedor & El-Alami, 1999^{c g}
- Acentrella barbarae Jacobus and McCafferty, 2006^{i c g}
- Acentrella chantauensis (Kluge, 1981)^{c g}
- Acentrella charadra Sroka & Arnekleiv, 2010^{c g}
- Acentrella diptera Kluge & Novikova, 2011^{c g}
- Acentrella feminalis (Eaton, 1885)^{c g}
- Acentrella fenestrata (Kazlauskas, 1963)^{i c g}
- Acentrella feropagus Alba-Tercedor and McCafferty, 2000^{i c g}
- Acentrella glareosa Sroka & Arnekleiv, 2010^{c g}
- Acentrella gnom (Kluge, 1983)^{c g}
- Acentrella hyaloptera (Bogoescu, 1951)^{c g}
- Acentrella inexpectata (Tshernova, 1928)^{i c g}
- Acentrella insignificans (McDunnough, 1926)^{i c g b}
- Acentrella joosti (Zimmermann & Braasch, 1979)^{c g}
- Acentrella lapponica Bengtsson, 1912^{i c g}
- Acentrella lata (Müller-Liebenau, 1985)^{c g}
- Acentrella nadineae McCafferty, Waltz & Webb, 2009^{i c g b}
- Acentrella parvula (McDunnough, 1932)^{i c g}
- Acentrella rallatoma Burian & Myers, 2011^{c g}
- Acentrella scabriventris Kluge & Novikova, 2011^{c g}
- Acentrella sibirica (Kazlauskas, 1963)^{c g}
- Acentrella sinaica Bogoescu, 1931^{c g}
- Acentrella suzukiella Matsumura, 1931^{c g}
- Acentrella tonneri (Braasch & Soldán, 1983)^{c}
- Acentrella turbida (McDunnough, 1924)^{i c g b}

Data sources: i = ITIS, c = Catalogue of Life, g = GBIF, b = Bugguide.net
