= Afroptilum =

Scientific classification
- Domain: Eukaryota
- Kingdom: Animalia
- Phylum: Arthropoda
- Class: Insecta
- Order: Ephemeroptera
- Family: Baetidae
- Subfamily: Baetinae
- Genus: Afroptilum; Gillies, 1990

Genus of insects

Afroptilum is a genus of mayflies belonging to the family Baetidae.

The species of this genus are found in Southern Africa.

Species:

- Afroptilum biarcuatum (Kopelke, 1980)
- Afroptilum bicorne (Ulmer, 1909)
- Afroptilum boettgeri (Kopelke, 1980)
- Afroptilum confusum Lugo-Ortiz & McCafferty, 1998
- Afroptilum dicentrum (Demoulin, 1956)
- Afroptilum gilberti Gattolliat & Sartori, 1999
- Afroptilum lepidum Lugo-Ortiz & McCafferty, 1998
- Afroptilum mathildae Gattolliat & Sartori, 1999
- Afroptilum parvum (Crass, 1947)
- Afroptilum sudafricanum (Lestage, 1924)
