= Barbaetis =

Scientific classification
- Domain: Eukaryota
- Kingdom: Animalia
- Phylum: Arthropoda
- Class: Insecta
- Order: Ephemeroptera
- Family: Baetidae
- Subfamily: Baetinae
- Genus: Barbaetis; Waltz and McCafferty, 1985

Genus of mayflies

Barbaetis is a genus of mayflies in the family Baetidae.
