= Pseudocentroptiloides =

Scientific classification
- Domain: Eukaryota
- Kingdom: Animalia
- Phylum: Arthropoda
- Class: Insecta
- Order: Ephemeroptera
- Family: Baetidae
- Subfamily: Baetinae
- Genus: Pseudocentroptiloides; Jacob, 1986

Genus of mayflies

Pseudocentroptiloides is a genus of Palaearctic and Oriental mayflies in the family Baetidae.

== Species ==
The following are included in BioLib.cz:

subgenus Psammonella Glazaczow, 1986

1. Pseudocentroptiloides ceylonica Glazaczow, 1986

subgenus Pseudocentroptiloides Jacob in Jacob & Glazaczow, 1986

1. Pseudocentroptiloides morihari Wiersema & McCafferty, 1998
2. Pseudocentroptiloides shadini (Kazlauskas, 1964)
3. Pseudocentroptiloides usa Waltz & McCafferty, 1989

unplaced genera

1. Pseudocentroptiloides nana (Bogoescu, 1951)
2. Pseudocentroptiloides romanica (Bogoescu, 1949)
