= Baetodes =

Scientific classification
- Kingdom: Animalia
- Phylum: Arthropoda
- Clade: Pancrustacea
- Class: Insecta
- Order: Ephemeroptera
- Family: Baetidae
- Genus: Baetodes; Needham & Murphy, 1924

Genus of mayflies

Baetodes is a genus of mayflies in the family Baetidae, from the Americas.

== Species ==
BioLib includes:

1. Baetodes adustus Cohen & Allen, 1972
2. Baetodes alleni McCafferty & Provonsha, 1993
3. Baetodes andamagensis Mayo, 1972
4. Baetodes arawak (Traver, 1943)
5. Baetodes arizonensis Koss, 1972
6. Baetodes bibranchius McCafferty & Provonsha, 1993
7. Baetodes caritus Cohen & Allen, 1972
8. Baetodes chilloni Mayo, 1972
9. Baetodes cochunaensis Nieto, 2004
10. Baetodes copiosus Nieto, 2004
11. Baetodes deficiens Cohen & Allen, 1972
12. Baetodes deludens Lugo-Ortiz & McCafferty, 1995
13. Baetodes edmundsi Koss, 1972
14. Baetodes fortinensis Mayo, 1972
15. Baetodes fuscipes Cohen & Allen, 1972
16. Baetodes gibbus Nieto, 2004
17. Baetodes huaico Nieto, 2004
18. Baetodes inermis Cohen & Allen, 1972
19. Baetodes itatiayanus Demoulin, 1955
20. Baetodes levis Mayo, 1968
21. Baetodes longus Mayo, 1973
22. Baetodes noventus Cohen & Allen, 1972
23. Baetodes obesus Mayo, 1972
24. Baetodes pallidus Cohen & Allen, 1972
25. Baetodes pehuenche Nieto, 2004
26. Baetodes peniculus Mayo, 1973
27. Baetodes pictus Cohen & Allen, 1972
28. Baetodes proiectus Mayo, 1973
29. Baetodes pseudogibbus Nieto, 2004
30. Baetodes rutilus Nieto, 2004
31. Baetodes sancticatarinae Mayo, 1972
32. Baetodes serratus Needham & Murphy, 1924
33. Baetodes solus Mayo, 1972
34. Baetodes spinae Mayo, 1968
35. Baetodes spiniferum Traver, 1943
36. Baetodes traverae Mayo, 1972
37. Baetodes tritus Cohen & Allen, 1972
38. Baetodes uruguai Nieto, 2004
39. Baetodes velmae Cohen & Allen, 1978
40. Baetodes yuracare Nieto, 2004

Old list - several spp. forwarding to Cloeodes

- Baetodes alleni
- Baetodes arizonensis
- Baetodes awa
- Baetodes bibranchius
- Baetodes caritus
- Baetodes deficiens
- Baetodes deludens
- Baetodes diasae
- Baetodes edmundsi
- Baetodes fortinensis
- Baetodes fuscipes
- Baetodes inermis
- Baetodes levis
- Baetodes liviae
- Baetodes longus
- Baetodes noventus
- Baetodes obesus
- Baetodes pallidus
- Baetodes pictus
- Baetodes pseudospinae
- Baetodes santatereza
- Baetodes solus
- Baetodes spinae
- Baetodes tritus
- Baetodes velmae
