= Camelobaetidius =

Scientific classification
- Domain: Eukaryota
- Kingdom: Animalia
- Phylum: Arthropoda
- Class: Insecta
- Order: Ephemeroptera
- Family: Baetidae
- Subfamily: Baetinae
- Genus: Camelobaetidius; Demoulin, 1966

Synonyms
- Dactylobaetis Traver and Edmunds, 1968

Genus of mayflies

Camelobaetidius is a genus of small minnow mayflies in the family Baetidae. There are at least 40 described species in Camelobaetidius.

== Species ==
These 44 species belong to the genus Camelobaetidius:

- Camelobaetidius alcyoneus (Traver, 1943)^{c g}
- Camelobaetidius anubis (Traver & Edmunds, 1968)^{c g}
- Camelobaetidius arriaga (Traver and Edmunds, 1968)^{i c g}
- Camelobaetidius baumgardneri^{g}
- Camelobaetidius billi Thomas & Dominique, 2000^{c g}
- Camelobaetidius carolinae^{g}
- Camelobaetidius cayumba (Traver & Edmunds, 1968)^{c g}
- Camelobaetidius cruzi^{g}
- Camelobaetidius dryops (Needham & Murphy, 1924)^{c g}
- Camelobaetidius edmundsi Dominique, Thomas & Mathuriau, 2001^{c g}
- Camelobaetidius francischettii Salles, Andrade & Da-Silva, 2005^{c g}
- Camelobaetidius hamadae Salles & Serrao, 2005^{c g}
- Camelobaetidius huarpe Nieto, 2003^{c g}
- Camelobaetidius ipaye Nieto, 2004^{c g}
- Camelobaetidius janae Thomas & Dominique, 2000^{c g}
- Camelobaetidius juparana Boldrini & Salles, 2012^{c g}
- Camelobaetidius kickapoo McCafferty in McCafferty and Randolph, 2000^{i c g}
- Camelobaetidius kondratieffi Lugo-Ortiz and McCafferty, 1995^{i c g}
- Camelobaetidius lassance Salles & Serrao, 2005^{c g}
- Camelobaetidius leentvaari Demoulin, 1966^{c g}
- Camelobaetidius maidu Jacobus and McCafferty, 2005^{i c g}
- Camelobaetidius mantis Traver & Edmunds, 1968^{c g}
- Camelobaetidius maranhensis Salles & Serrao, 2005^{c g}
- Camelobaetidius mathuriae Dominique & Thomas, 2001^{c g}
- Camelobaetidius matilei Thomas, Peru & Horeau, 2001^{c g}
- Camelobaetidius mexicanus (Traver and Edmunds, 1968)^{i c g}
- Camelobaetidius musseri (Traver and Edmunds, 1968)^{i c g}
- Camelobaetidius ortizi Dominique & Thomas, 2001^{c g}
- Camelobaetidius patricki Dominique & Thomas, 2001^{c g}
- Camelobaetidius penai (Traver & Edmunds, 1968)^{c g}
- Camelobaetidius phaedrus (Traver & Edmunds, 1968)^{c g}
- Camelobaetidius rufiventris Boldrini & Salles, 2009^{c g}
- Camelobaetidius sallesi^{g}
- Camelobaetidius serapis (Traver & Edmunds, 1968)^{c g}
- Camelobaetidius shepardi Randolph and McCafferty, 2001^{i c g}
- Camelobaetidius spinosus Boldrini & Salles, 2012^{c g}
- Camelobaetidius suapi Nieto, 2002^{c g}
- Camelobaetidius tantillus (Needham & Murphy, 1924)^{c g}
- Camelobaetidius tepequensis^{g}
- Camelobaetidius tuberosus Lugo-Ortiz & McCafferty, 1999^{c g}
- Camelobaetidius variabilis Wiersema, 1998^{i c g}
- Camelobaetidius waltzi McCafferty, 1994^{i c g}
- Camelobaetidius warreni (Traver & Edmunds, 1968)^{i c g b}
- Camelobaetidius yacutinga Nieto, 2003^{c g}

Data sources: i = ITIS, c = Catalogue of Life, g = GBIF, b = Bugguide.net
