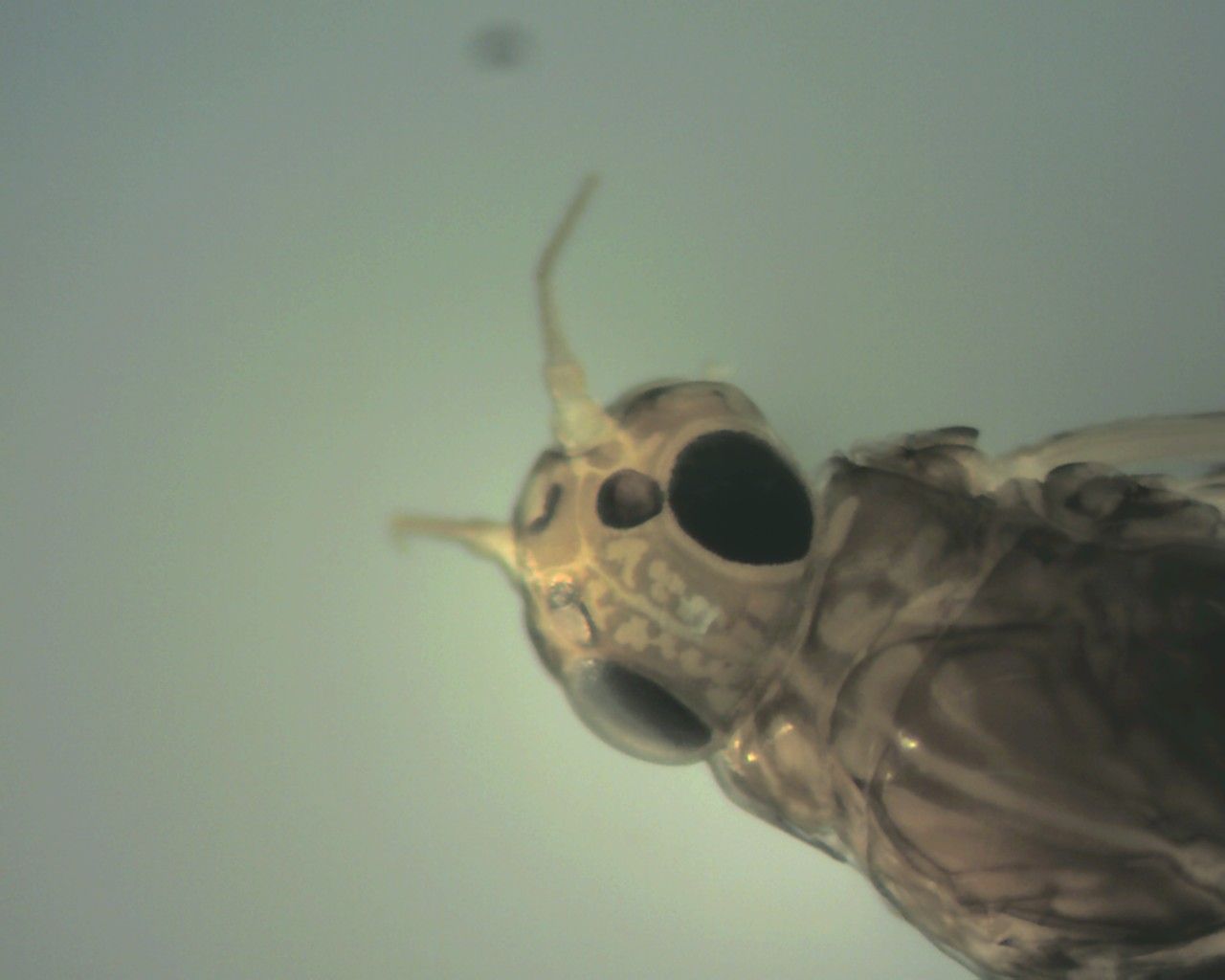
- Head of Pseudocloeon

Scientific classification
- Domain: Eukaryota
- Kingdom: Animalia
- Phylum: Arthropoda
- Class: Insecta
- Order: Ephemeroptera
- Family: Baetidae
- Subfamily: Baetinae
- Genus: Pseudocloeon; Klapálek, 1905

= Pseudocloeon =

Genus of insects

Pseudocloeon is a genus of mayflies belonging to the family Baetidae.

The species of this genus are found in eastern Europe, North America, Africa and Southeastern Asia.

== Species ==
BioLib includes:

1. Pseudocloeon ancoralis (Shi & Tong, 2014)
2. Pseudocloeon apache (McCafferty & Waltz, 1995)
3. Pseudocloeon aquacidum Lugo-Ortiz & McCafferty, 1997
4. Pseudocloeon atrebatinus (Eaton, 1870)
5. Pseudocloeon balcanicus (Muller-Liebenau & Soldán, 1981)
6. Pseudocloeon bellum Barnard, 1932
7. Pseudocloeon boettgeri (Ulmer, 1924)
8. Pseudocloeon borneoensis (Müller-Liebenau, 1984)
9. Pseudocloeon boussoulium Gillies, 1993
10. Pseudocloeon calcaratus (Keffermüller, 1972)
11. Pseudocloeon cataractae (Crass, 1947)
12. Pseudocloeon chonganensis Gui & al., 1999
13. Pseudocloeon cleopatrae (Thomas & Soldán, 1989)
14. Pseudocloeon dambrensis (Gattolliat, 2001)
15. Pseudocloeon dardanum McDunnough, 1923
16. Pseudocloeon desertum (Novikova & Kluge, 1987)
17. Pseudocloeon difficile (Müller-Liebenau, 1984)
18. Pseudocloeon diffundum (Müller-Liebenau, 1984)
19. Pseudocloeon dipsicum (Gillies, 1949)
20. Pseudocloeon elouardi (Gillies, 1993)
21. Pseudocloeon ephippiatum (Traver, 1935)
22. Pseudocloeon fabulosus (Lugo-Ortiz & McCafferty, 1997)
23. Pseudocloeon fastigatum Kopelke, 1980
24. Pseudocloeon frondale (McDunnough, 1925)
25. Pseudocloeon fulmeki (Ulmer, 1939)
26. Pseudocloeon geminatus (Müller-Liebenau & Hubbard, 1985)
27. Pseudocloeon gilliesi (Gattolliat, 2001)
28. Pseudocloeon glaucum Agnew, 1961
29. Pseudocloeon grandiculum Kopelke, 1980
30. Pseudocloeon hypodelum Lugo-Ortiz & McCafferty in Lugo-Ortiz, McCafferty & Waltz, 1999
31. Pseudocloeon inconspicuum Lugo-Ortiz & McCafferty in Lugo-Ortiz, McCafferty & Waltz, 1999
32. Pseudocloeon inopinum Gillies, 1949
33. Pseudocloeon insolitum Kopelke, 1980
34. Pseudocloeon involutum Lugo-Ortiz & McCafferty in Lugo-Ortiz, McCafferty & Waltz, 1999
35. Pseudocloeon kalengoense Kopelke, 1980
36. Pseudocloeon kraepelini Klapálek, 1905
37. Pseudocloeon latum Agnew, 1961
38. Pseudocloeon longicercus (Gattolliat, 2001)
39. Pseudocloeon longipalpus (Morihara & McCafferty, 1979)
40. Pseudocloeon maiconis (Takahashi, 1924)
41. Pseudocloeon molawinensis (Müller-Liebenau, 1982)
42. Pseudocloeon moriharai (Müller-Liebenau, 1984)
43. Pseudocloeon mtone Gillies, 1994
44. Pseudocloeon multum (Müller-Liebenau, 1984)
45. Pseudocloeon mustus (Kang & Yang, 1996)
46. Pseudocloeon necopinatum (Müller-Liebenau, 1981)
47. Pseudocloeon neglectus Navás, 1913
48. Pseudocloeon nigrocercus (Gattolliat, 2001)
49. Pseudocloeon nigrovena Gui, Zhou & Su, 1999
50. Pseudocloeon numeratum (Müller-Liebenau, 1984)
51. Pseudocloeon obscurum Ulmer, 1913
52. Pseudocloeon operosum (Müller-Liebenau, 1984)
53. Pseudocloeon ordinatum (Müller-Liebenau & Hubbard, 1985)
54. Pseudocloeon palmyrae (Gillies, 1949)
55. Pseudocloeon petersorum Lugo-Ortiz & McCafferty in Lugo-Ortiz, McCafferty & Waltz, 1999
56. Pseudocloeon piscis (Lugo-Ortiz & McCafferty, 1997)
57. Pseudocloeon plectile Lugo-Ortiz & McCafferty in Lugo-Ortiz, McCafferty & Waltz, 1999
58. Pseudocloeon plumbago (Lugo-Ortiz & McCafferty, 1997)
59. Pseudocloeon propinquum (Walsh, 1863)
60. Pseudocloeon pulchellum (Müller-Liebenau & Hubbard, 1985)
61. Pseudocloeon punctatus (Gattolliat, 2001)
62. Pseudocloeon purpurata Gui, Zhou & Su, 1999
63. Pseudocloeon rubellum Navás, 1931
64. Pseudocloeon soldani (Kubendran et al., 2014)
65. Pseudocloeon sumigarense (Müller-Liebenau, 1982)
66. Pseudocloeon tenuicrinitum Kopelke, 1980
67. Pseudocloeon tuberpalpus Lugo-Ortiz & McCafferty in Lugo-Ortiz, McCafferty & Waltz, 1999
68. Pseudocloeon ulmeri (Müller-Liebenau, 1981)
69. Pseudocloeon vinosum Barnard, 1932
70. Pseudocloeon vitile Lugo-Ortiz & McCafferty in Lugo-Ortiz, McCafferty & Waltz, 1999
71. Pseudocloeon vulgaris (Gattolliat, 2001)
72. Pseudocloeon vultuosum Lugo-Ortiz & McCafferty in Lugo-Ortiz, McCafferty & Waltz, 1999
73. Pseudocloeon xeniolum Lugo-Ortiz & McCafferty in Lugo-Ortiz, McCafferty & Waltz, 1999
