= Baetopus =

Scientific classification
- Domain: Eukaryota
- Kingdom: Animalia
- Phylum: Arthropoda
- Class: Insecta
- Order: Ephemeroptera
- Family: Baetidae
- Subfamily: Baetinae
- Genus: Baetopus; Keffermüller, 1960

Genus of mayflies

Baetopus is a genus of European mayflies in the subfamily Baetinae.

== Species ==
The Global Biodiversity Information Facility lists:

1. Baetopus asiaticus Soldán, 1978
2. Baetopus montanus Soldán, 1978
3. Baetopus trishae Waltz, 2002
4. Baetopus wartensis Keffermüller, 1960
