= Americabaetis =

Scientific classification
- Domain: Eukaryota
- Kingdom: Animalia
- Phylum: Arthropoda
- Class: Insecta
- Order: Ephemeroptera
- Family: Baetidae
- Subfamily: Baetinae
- Genus: Americabaetis; Kluge, 1992

Genus of mayflies

Americabaetis is a genus of mayflies in the subfamily Baetinae.

== Species ==
BioLib includes:

1. Americabaetis alphus Lugo-Ortiz & McCafferty, 1996
2. Americabaetis boriquensis (Lugo-Ortiz & McCafferty, 1994)
3. Americabaetis bridarollii (Navás, 1932)
4. Americabaetis humilis Hofmann & Thomas, 1999
5. Americabaetis intermedius Lugo-Ortiz & McCafferty, 1994
6. Americabaetis jorgenseni (Esben-Petersen, 1909)
7. Americabaetis labiosus Lugo-Ortiz & McCafferty, 1996
8. Americabaetis longetron Lugo-Ortiz & McCafferty, 1996
9. Americabaetis lugoi Waltz & McCafferty, 1999
10. Americabaetis maxifolium Lugo-Ortiz & McCafferty, 1996
11. Americabaetis mecistognathus Salles & Raimundi, 2010
12. Americabaetis naranjoi (Kluge, 1992)
13. Americabaetis oldendorffii (Weyenbergh, 1883)
14. Americabaetis peterseni (Hubbard, 1974)
15. Americabaetis pleturus Lugo-Ortiz & McCafferty, 1994
16. Americabaetis robacki (Lugo-Ortiz & McCafferty, 1994)
17. Americabaetis spinosus Hofmann & Thomas, 1999
18. Americabaetis titthion Lugo-Ortiz & McCafferty, 1996
19. Americabaetis weiseri (Navás, 1926)
