= Alainites =

Scientific classification
- Domain: Eukaryota
- Kingdom: Animalia
- Phylum: Arthropoda
- Class: Insecta
- Order: Ephemeroptera
- Family: Baetidae
- Subfamily: Baetinae
- Genus: Alainites; Waltz et al., 1994

Synonyms
- Acerbaetis Kang & Yang, 1994

Genus of mayflies

External image
- Image at iNaturalist

Alainites is a genus of Palaearctic and Oriental mayflies in the family Baetidae, erected by R.D. Waltz et al. in 1994. About eight species are predominantly European, with A. muticus (Linnaeus, 1758) previously considered a species group of the genus Baetis (which was subsequently recognised as polyphyletic). The latter is sometimes called the "iron blue", although this name is used by anglers to include at least two species in the related genus Nigrobaetis and has a widespread distribution, including the British Isles.

== Species ==
The Global Biodiversity Information Facility includes:

1. Alainites acutulus Tong & Dudgeon, 2000
2. Alainites albinatii (Sartori & Thomas, 1989)
3. Alainites atagonis (Imanishi, 1937)
4. Alainites bengunn Yanai & Gattolliat, 2022
5. Alainites chocoratus (Gose, 1980)
6. Alainites clivosus (Chang & Yang, 1994)
7. Alainites florens (Imanishi, 1937)
8. Alainites gasithi Yanai & Gattolliat, 2022
9. Alainites kars (Thomas & Kazanci, 1989)
10. Alainites laetificus (Müller-Liebenau, 1984)
11. Alainites lingulatus Tong & Dudgeon, 2000
12. Alainites muticus (Linnaeus, 1758)
13. Alainites navasi (Müller-Liebenau, 1974)
14. Alainites oukaimeden (Thomas & Sartori, 1991)
15. Alainites pascalae Gattolliat, 2011
16. Alainites pekingensis (Ulmer, 1936)
17. Alainites sacishimensis (Uéno, 1969)
18. Alainites sadati Thomas, 1994
19. Alainites siamensis Phlai-ngam, Tungpairojwong & Gattolliat, 2022
20. Alainites talasi (Novikova & Kluge, 1994)
21. Alainites yehi (Kang & Yang, 1994)
22. Alainites yoshinensis (Gose, 1980)
