= Mesobaetis =

Scientific classification
- Domain: Eukaryota
- Kingdom: Animalia
- Phylum: Arthropoda
- Class: Insecta
- Order: Ephemeroptera
- Family: Siphlonuridae
- Genus: †Mesobaetis; Brauer, Redtenbacher & Ganglbauer, 1889

Genus of insects

Mesobaetis is an extinct genus of mayflies belonging to the family Siphlonuridae.

Fossils of this genus have been found in Central Asia.

== Species ==
These species belong to the genus Mesobaetis:

- † Mesobaetis allata Sinitshenkova, 1985
- † Mesobaetis amplectus Sinitshenkova, 2000
- † Mesobaetis crispa Sinitshenkova, 2017
- † Mesobaetis latifilamentacea Zhang, 2006
- † Mesobaetis maculata Hong, 1995
- † Mesobaetis mandalensis Sinitshenkova, 1989
- † Mesobaetis ornata Sinitshenkova, 2000
- † Mesobaetis sanjianfangensis Hong, 1995
- † Mesobaetis sibirica Brauer et al., 1889
