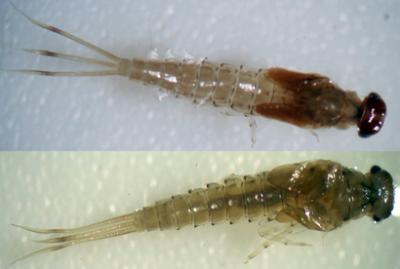
- Labiobaetis soldani larvae

Scientific classification
- Kingdom: Animalia
- Phylum: Arthropoda
- Class: Insecta
- Order: Ephemeroptera
- Family: Baetidae
- Subfamily: Baetinae
- Genus: Labiobaetis; Novikova & Kluge, 1987

= Labiobaetis =

Genus of mayflies

Labiobaetis is a genus of mayflies in the family Baetidae.

== Species ==
- Labiobaetis academicus Kaltenbach, Surbakti & Kluge, 2021
- Labiobaetis acei Kaltenbach, Garces & Gattolliat, 2020
- Labiobaetis alahmadii Gattolliat & Al Dhafer, 2018
- Labiobaetis aldabae Kaltenbach, Garces & Gattolliat, 2020
- Labiobaetis altus Kaltenbach & Gattolliat, 2018
- Labiobaetis ancoralis Shi & Tong, 2014
- Labiobaetis apache McCafferty & Waltz, 1995
- Labiobaetis aquacidus Lugo-Ortiz & McCafferty, 1997
- Labiobaetis arfak Kaltenbach & Gattolliat, 2021
- Labiobaetis atrebatinus (Eaton 1870)
- Labiobaetis baganii Kaltenbach, Garces & Gattolliat, 2020
- Labiobaetis bakerae Kaltenbach & Gattolliat, 2020
- Labiobaetis balcanicus (Müller-Liebenau & Soldán, 1981)
- Labiobaetis balkei Kaltenbach & Gattolliat, 2018
- Labiobaetis batakorum Kaltenbach & Gattolliat, 2019
- Labiobaetis bellus (Barnard, 1932)
- Labiobaetis boettgeri (Ulmer, 1924)
- Labiobaetis borneoensis (Müller-Liebenau, 1984)
- Labiobaetis boussoulius (Gillies, 1993)
- Labiobaetis branchiaesetis Kaltenbach & Gattolliat, 2018
- Labiobaetis camiguinensis Kaltenbach, Garces & Gattolliat, 2020
- Labiobaetis catadupa Kaltenbach & Gattolliat, 2021
- Labiobaetis centralensis Kaltenbach & Gattolliat, 2018
- Labiobaetis claudiae Kaltenbach & Gattolliat, 2018
- Labiobaetis cleopatrae (Thomas & Soldán, 1989)
- Labiobaetis dalisay Kaltenbach, Garces & Gattolliat, 2020
- Labiobaetis dambrensis Gattolliat, 2001
- Labiobaetis dayakorum Kaltenbach & Gattolliat, 2020
- Labiobaetis delocadoi Kaltenbach, Garces & Gattolliat, 2020
- Labiobaetis dendrisetis Kaltenbach & Gattolliat, 2018
- Labiobaetis difficilis (Müller-Liebenau, 1984)
- Labiobaetis diffundus (Müller-Liebenau, 1984)
- Labiobaetis ediai Kaltenbach & Gattolliat, 2021
- Labiobaetis elisae Kaltenbach & Gattolliat, 2018
- Labiobaetis elouardi (Gillies, 1993)
- Labiobaetis excavatus Kaltenbach & Gattolliat, 2021
- Labiobaetis fabulosus Lugo-Ortiz & McCafferty, 1997
- Labiobaetis freitagi Kaltenbach, Garces & Gattolliat, 2020
- Labiobaetis gamay Kaltenbach, Garces & Gattolliat, 2020
- Labiobaetis gambiae (Gillies, 1993)
- Labiobaetis gilliesi Gattolliat, 2001
- Labiobaetis gindroi Kaltenbach & Gattolliat, 2018
- Labiobaetis giselae Kaltenbach, Garces & Gattolliat, 2020
- Labiobaetis gladius Kaltenbach & Gattolliat, 2018
- Labiobaetis glaucus (Agnew, 1961)
- Labiobaetis gueuningi Kaltenbach & Gattolliat, 2019
- Labiobaetis hattam Kaltenbach & Gattolliat, 2021
- Labiobaetis insolitus (Kopelke, 1981)
- Labiobaetis itineris Kaltenbach & Gattolliat, 2019
- Labiobaetis jacobusi Kubendran & Balasubramanian, 2015
- Labiobaetis janae Kaltenbach & Gattolliat, 2018
- Labiobaetis jonasi Kaltenbach & Gattolliat, 2019
- Labiobaetis kalengoensis (Kopelke, 1980)
- Labiobaetis lachicae Kaltenbach, Garces & Gattolliat, 2020
- Labiobaetis latus (Agnew, 1961)
- Labiobaetis lobatus Kaltenbach & Gattolliat, 2018
- Labiobaetis longicercus Gattolliat, 2001
- Labiobaetis lubu Kaltenbach & Gattolliat, 2019
- Labiobaetis masai Lugo-Ortiz & McCafferty, 1997
- Labiobaetis mendozai Kaltenbach, Garces & Gattolliat, 2020
- Labiobaetis michaeli Kaltenbach & Gattolliat, 2018
- Labiobaetis minang Kaltenbach & Gattolliat, 2019
- Labiobaetis molawinensis (Müller-Liebenau, 1982)
- Labiobaetis moriharai Müller-Liebenau, 1984
- Labiobaetis morus (Chang & Yang, 1994)
- Labiobaetis mtonis (Gillies, 1994)
- Labiobaetis multus (Müller-Liebenau, 1984)
- Labiobaetis mustus (Kang & Yang, 1996)
- Labiobaetis nadineae Lugo-Ortiz & McCafferty, 1997
- Labiobaetis nigrocercus Gattolliat, 2001
- Labiobaetis numeratus (Müller-Liebenau, 1984)
- Labiobaetis onim Kaltenbach & Gattolliat, 2021
- Labiobaetis operosus (Müller-Liebenau, 1984)
- Labiobaetis orientis Kaltenbach & Gattolliat, 2018
- Labiobaetis pakpak Kaltenbach & Gattolliat, 2019
- Labiobaetis palawano Kaltenbach, Garces & Gattolliat, 2020
- Labiobaetis pangantihoni Kaltenbach, Garces & Gattolliat, 2020
- Labiobaetis papuaensis Kaltenbach & Gattolliat, 2018
- Labiobaetis paradiffundus Kaltenbach & Gattolliat, 2019
- Labiobaetis paranumeratus Kaltenbach & Gattolliat, 2019
- Labiobaetis paravitilis Kaltenbach & Gattolliat, 2018
- Labiobaetis paravultuosus Kaltenbach & Gattolliat, 2018
- Labiobaetis pelingeni Kaltenbach, Garces & Gattolliat, 2020
- Labiobaetis penan Kaltenbach & Gattolliat, 2020
- Labiobaetis pilosus Kaltenbach & Gattolliat, 2019
- Labiobaetis piscis Lugo-Ortiz & McCafferty, 1997
- Labiobaetis planus Kaltenbach & Gattolliat, 2018
- Labiobaetis plumbago Lugo-Ortiz & McCafferty, 1997
- Labiobaetis podolakae Kaltenbach & Gattolliat, 2018
- Labiobaetis potamoticus Gattolliat & Al Dhafer, 2018
- Labiobaetis punctatus Gattolliat, 2001
- Labiobaetis rimba Kaltenbach & Gattolliat, 2019
- Labiobaetis roulade Kaltenbach & Gattolliat, 2019
- Labiobaetis sabordoi Kaltenbach, Garces & Gattolliat, 2020
- Labiobaetis schwanderae Kaltenbach & Gattolliat, 2018
- Labiobaetis seramensis Kaltenbach & Gattolliat, 2019
- Labiobaetis soldani Kubendran, Rathinakumar, Balasubramanian, Selvakumar & Sivaramakrishnan, 2014
- Labiobaetis sonajuventus Webb, 2013
- Labiobaetis stagnum Kaltenbach & Gattolliat, 2018
- Labiobaetis sulawesiensis Kaltenbach & Gattolliat, 2019
- Labiobaetis sumbensis Kaltenbach & Gattolliat, 2019
- Labiobaetis sumigarensis (Müller-Liebenau, 1982)
- Labiobaetis tagbanwa Kaltenbach, Garces & Gattolliat, 2020
- Labiobaetis tenuicrinitus Kluge & Novikova, 2016
- Labiobaetis toraja Kaltenbach & Gattolliat, 2021
- Labiobaetis tricolor (Tshernova 1928)
- Labiobaetis valdezorum Kaltenbach, Garces & Gattolliat, 2020
- Labiobaetis vallus Kaltenbach & Gattolliat, 2018
- Labiobaetis vinosus (Barnard, 1932)
- Labiobaetis vulgaris Gattolliat, 2001
- Labiobaetis wahai Kaltenbach & Gattolliat, 2019
- Labiobaetis wantzeni Kaltenbach, Garces & Gattolliat, 2020
- Labiobaetis weifangae Kaltenbach & Gattolliat, 2019
- Labiobaetis werneri Kaltenbach & Gattolliat, 2021
- Labiobaetis xeniolus (Lugo-Ortiz & McCafferty, 1999)
