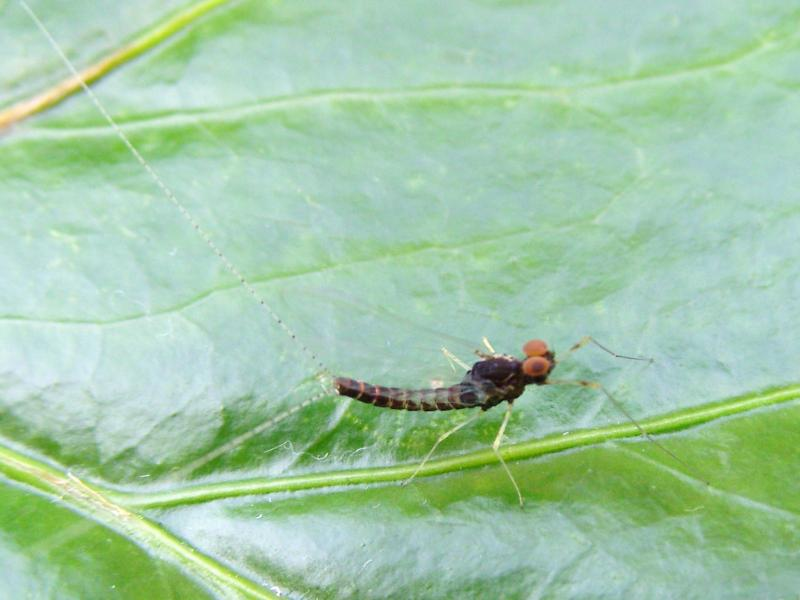
- Centroptilum luteolum

Scientific classification
- Kingdom: Animalia
- Phylum: Arthropoda
- Clade: Pancrustacea
- Class: Insecta
- Order: Ephemeroptera
- Family: Baetidae
- Subfamily: Baetinae
- Genus: Centroptilum; Eaton, 1869

= Centroptilum =

Genus of mayflies

Centroptilum is a genus of mayflies of the family Baetidae.

== Species ==
- Centroptilum luteolum
- Centroptilum pennulatum
