= Nigrobaetis =

Scientific classification
- Kingdom: Animalia
- Phylum: Arthropoda
- Class: Insecta
- Order: Ephemeroptera
- Family: Baetidae
- Subfamily: Baetinae
- Genus: Nigrobaetis; Novikova & Kluge, 1987

Synonyms
- Margobaetis Kang & Yang, 1994

Genus of insects

Nigrobaetis is a genus of small minnow mayflies in the family Baetidae. There are more than 30 described species in Nigrobaetis, found in Europe, Africa, and Asia.

== Species ==
- Nigrobaetis acinaciger (Kluge, 1983)
- Nigrobaetis arabiensis Gattolliat & Sartori, 2008
- Nigrobaetis atagonis (Imanishi, 1937)
- Nigrobaetis bacillus (Kluge, 1983)
- Nigrobaetis bethuneae Lugo-Ortiz & de Moor, 2000
- Nigrobaetis candidus (Kang & Yang, 1996)
- Nigrobaetis chocoratus (Gose, 1980)
- Nigrobaetis clivosus (Chang & Yang, 1994)
- Nigrobaetis colonus Gattolliat, 2004
- Nigrobaetis cryptus Gattolliat, 2004
- Nigrobaetis digitatus (Bengtsson, 1912)
- Nigrobaetis facetus (Chang & Yang, 1994)
- Nigrobaetis gombaki (Müller-Liebenau, 1984)
- Nigrobaetis gracilentus (Chang & Yang, 1994)
- Nigrobaetis gracilis (Bogoescu & Tabacaru, 1957)
- Nigrobaetis harasab (Soldán, 1977)
- Nigrobaetis kars (Thomas & Kazanci, 1989)
- Nigrobaetis katerynae Martynov
- Nigrobaetis klugei Sivaruban, Srinivasan, Barathy & Isack, 2022
- Nigrobaetis laetificus (Müller-Liebenau, 1984)
- Nigrobaetis minutus (Müller-Liebenau, 1984)
- Nigrobaetis mirabilis (Müller-Liebenau, 1984)
- Nigrobaetis mundus (Chang & Yang, 1994)
- Nigrobaetis niger (Linnaeus, 1761)
- Nigrobaetis numidicus (Soldán & Thomas, 1983)
- Nigrobaetis paramakalyani Kubendran & Balasubramanian, 2015
- Nigrobaetis rhithralis (Soldán & Thomas, 1983)
- Nigrobaetis richardi Kaltenbach, Mary & Gattolliat, 2021
- Nigrobaetis sacishimensis (Uéno, 1969)
- Nigrobaetis taiwanensis (Müller-Liebenau, 1985)
- Nigrobaetis talasi (Novikova & Kluge, 1994)
- Nigrobaetis tatuensis (Müller-Liebenau, 1985)
- Nigrobaetis terminus (Chang & Yang, 1994)
- Nigrobaetis vuatazi Gattolliat & Sartori, 2012
