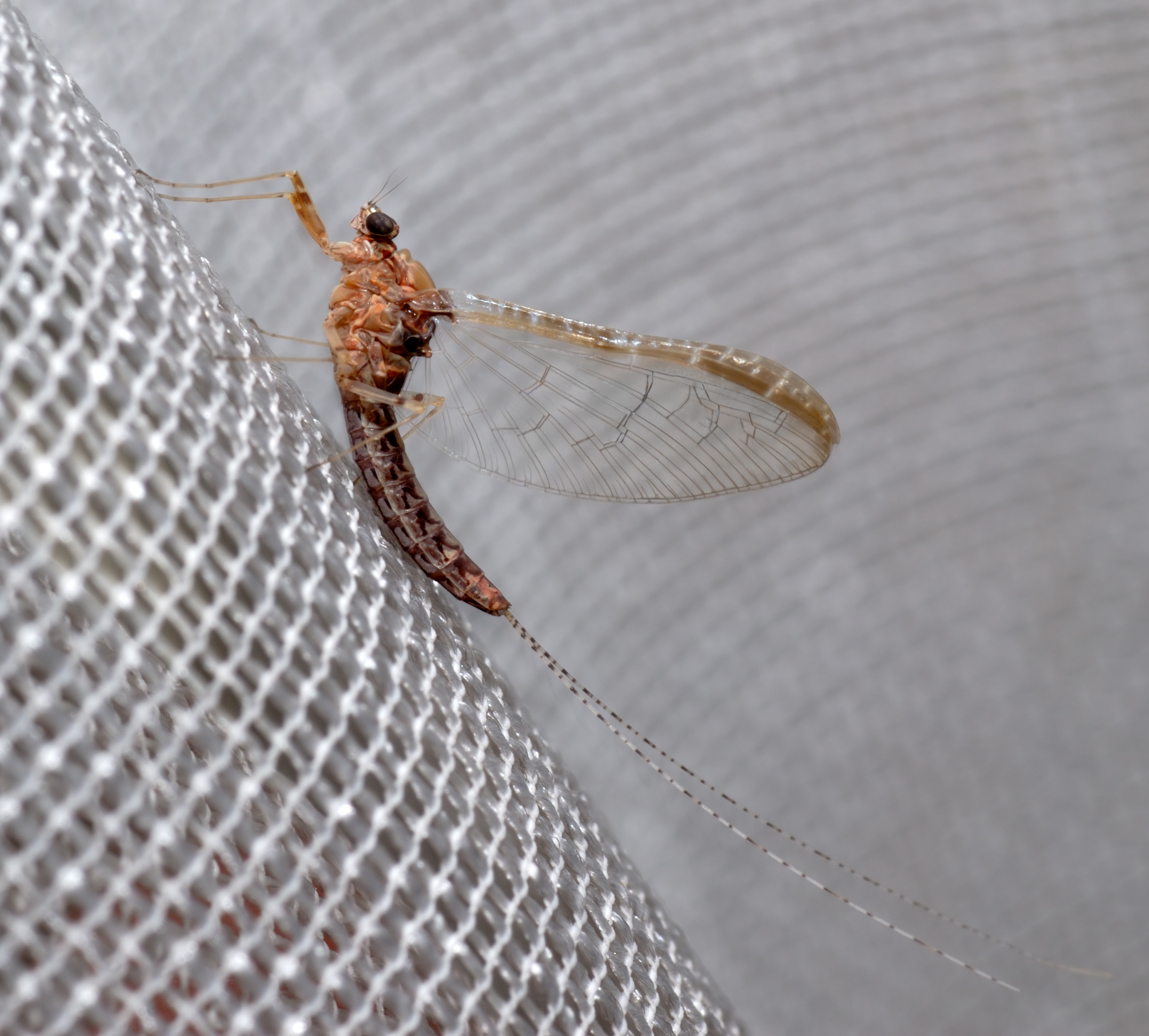
- Cloeon dipterum

Scientific classification
- Kingdom: Animalia
- Phylum: Arthropoda
- Class: Insecta
- Order: Ephemeroptera
- Suborder: Pisciforma
- Family: Baetidae; Leach 1815

= Baetidae =

Baetidae Temporal range: Cenomanian–Recent

Family of mayflies

Baetidae is a family of mayflies with about 1000 described species in 110 genera distributed worldwide. These are among the smallest of mayflies, adults rarely exceeding 10 mm in length excluding the two long slender tails and sometimes much smaller, and members of the family are often referred to as small mayflies or small minnow mayflies. Most species have long oval forewings with very few cross veins (see Comstock-Needham system) but the hindwings are usually very small or even absent. The males often have very large eyes, shaped like turrets above the head (this is known as "turbinate condition").

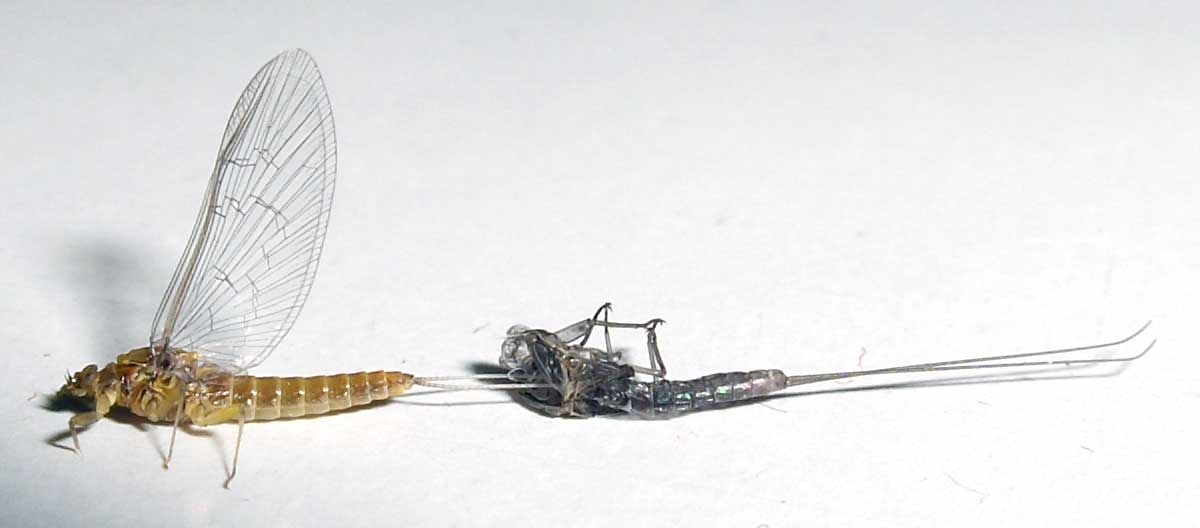
A baetid mayfly emerging from its exuvium

Baetids breed in a wide range of waters from lakes and streams to ditches and even water butts. The nymphs are strong swimmers and feed mainly on algae.

== Taxonomy ==
The majority of living genera (approximately 95) are placed in the subfamily Baetinae Leach, 1815, with the subfamily Palaeocloeoninae Kluge, 1997 consisting of the single genus †Palaeocloeon Kluge, 1997 from the Santonian aged Taimyr amber. The oldest members of the family date to the Late Cretaceous, with Myanmarella and Vetuformosa known from the Cenomanian aged Burmese amber. The genus Petracloeon Sroka & Gattolliat, 2025 is known from the Campanian-aged Tar Heel Formation of North Carolina, USA.

=== Selected genera in subfamily Baetinae ===
- Afroptilum Gillies, 1990
- Alainites Waltz et al., 1994
- Americabaetis Kluge, 1992
- Baetis Leach, 1815 (type genus)
- Baetopus Keffermüller, 1960
- Barbaetis Waltz and McCafferty, 1985
- Callibaetis Eaton, 1881
- Camelobaetidius Demoulin, 1966
- Centroptilum Eaton, 1869
- Cloeodes Traver, 1938
- Labiobaetis Novikova & Kluge, 1987
- Nigrobaetis Novikova & Kluge, 1987
- Procloeon Bengtsson, 1915
- Pseudocentroptiloides Jacob, 1986
- Pseudocloeon Klapálek, 1905

=== Unplaced genera ===
1. Acentrella Bengtsson, 1912
2. Acerobiella Gattolliat, 2012
3. Baetodes Needham & Murphy, 1924
4. Cloeon Leach, 1815
5. Cymbalcloeon Suttinun, Gattolliat & Boonsoong, 2020
6. Macuxi Cruz, Salles, Hamada & Falcão, 2020
7. Megabranchiella Phlai-ngam & Tungpairojwong, 2022
8. Paracloedes - monotypic P. leptobranchus Lugo-Ortiz & McCafferty, 1996
9. Procerobaetis Kaltenbach & Gattolliat, 2020
10. Waynokiops Hill, Pfeiffer & Jacobus, 2010

== See also ==
- List of mayflies of the British Isles
