= Siphlonurus quebecensis =

Scientific classification
- Domain: Eukaryota
- Kingdom: Animalia
- Phylum: Arthropoda
- Class: Insecta
- Order: Ephemeroptera
- Family: Siphlonuridae
- Genus: Siphlonurus
- Species: S. quebecensis

Binomial name
- Siphlonurus quebecensis (Provancher, 1878)

Synonyms
- Siphlonurus triangularis Clemens, 1915; Siphlurus quebecensis Provancher, 1878

Species of mayfly

Siphlonurus quebecensis is a species of primitive minnow mayfly in the family Siphlonuridae. It is found in North America.
