= Siphlonurus rapidus =

Scientific classification
- Domain: Eukaryota
- Kingdom: Animalia
- Phylum: Arthropoda
- Class: Insecta
- Order: Ephemeroptera
- Family: Siphlonuridae
- Genus: Siphlonurus
- Species: S. rapidus

Binomial name
- Siphlonurus rapidus McDunnough, 1924

Species of mayfly

Siphlonurus rapidus is a species of primitive minnow mayfly in the family Siphlonuridae. It is found in North America.
