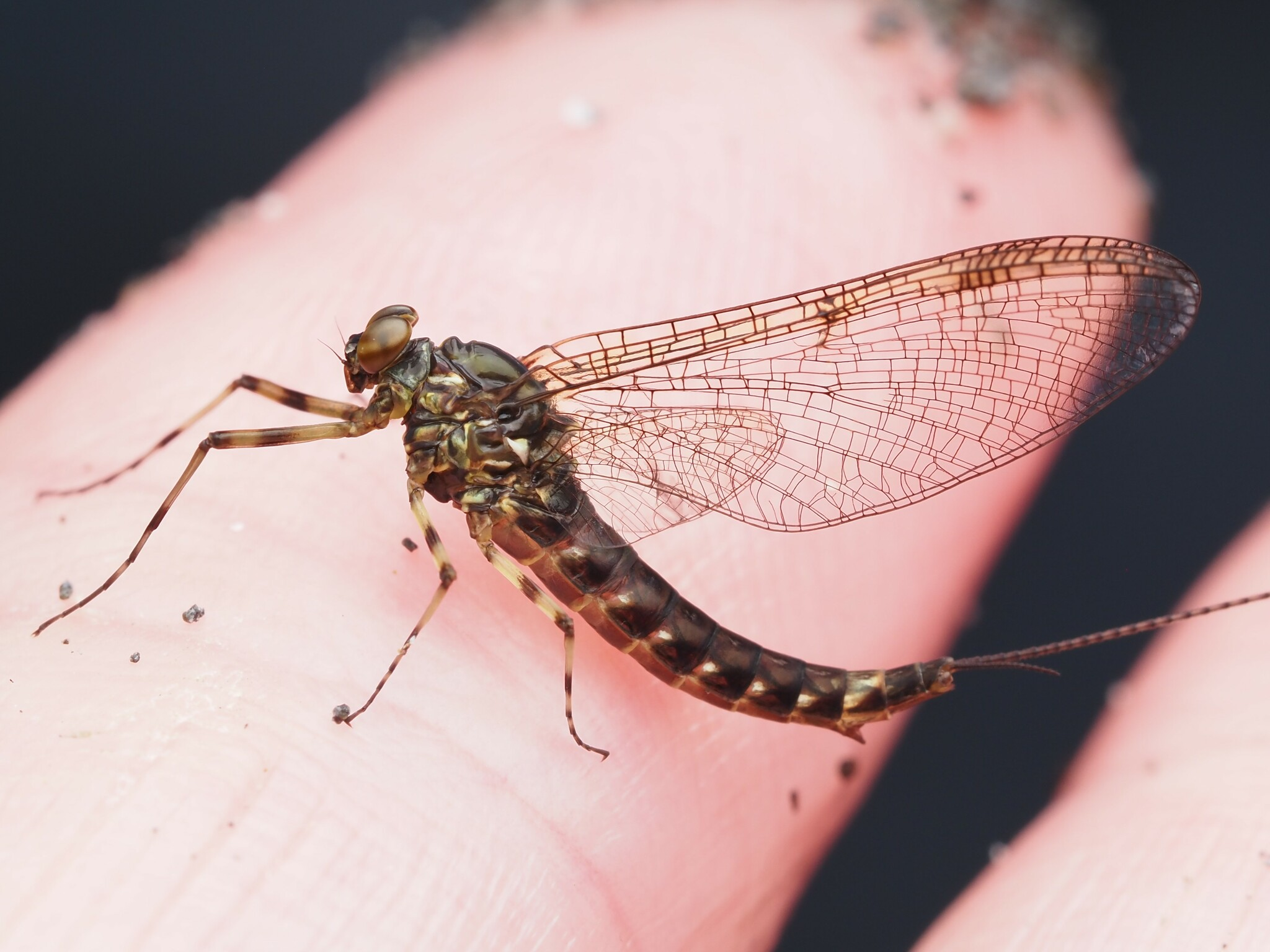
- Nesameletus ornatus found near the Hangatahua River, Taranaki, New Zealand

Scientific classification
- Kingdom: Animalia
- Phylum: Arthropoda
- Clade: Pancrustacea
- Class: Insecta
- Order: Ephemeroptera
- Family: Nesameletidae
- Genus: Nesameletus
- Species: N. ornatus

Binomial name
- Nesameletus ornatus (Eaton, 1883)

= Nesameletus ornatus =

Species of mayfly

Nesameletus ornatus, commonly known as the small swimming mayfly, is a species of mayfly in the Nesameletidae family. It is endemic to New Zealand. It was first described by Alfred Edwin Eaton in 1883.
