= Ametropus ammophilus =

Scientific classification
- Domain: Eukaryota
- Kingdom: Animalia
- Phylum: Arthropoda
- Class: Insecta
- Order: Ephemeroptera
- Family: Ametropodidae
- Genus: Ametropus
- Species: A. ammophilus

Binomial name
- Ametropus ammophilus Allen & Edmunds, 1976

Species of insect

Ametropus ammophilus is a species of sand minnow in the family Ametropodidae. It is found in southwestern Canada and the northwestern United States.
