= Siphlonurus spectabilis =

Scientific classification
- Domain: Eukaryota
- Kingdom: Animalia
- Phylum: Arthropoda
- Class: Insecta
- Order: Ephemeroptera
- Family: Siphlonuridae
- Genus: Siphlonurus
- Species: S. spectabilis

Binomial name
- Siphlonurus spectabilis Traver, 1934

Synonyms
- Siphlonurus maria Mayo, 1939

Species of mayfly

Siphlonurus spectabilis is a species of primitive minnow mayfly in the family Siphlonuridae. It is found in northern Canada and the western United States.
