= Siphlonurus marshalli =

Scientific classification
- Domain: Eukaryota
- Kingdom: Animalia
- Phylum: Arthropoda
- Class: Insecta
- Order: Ephemeroptera
- Family: Siphlonuridae
- Genus: Siphlonurus
- Species: S. marshalli

Binomial name
- Siphlonurus marshalli Traver, 1934

Species of mayfly

Siphlonurus marshalli is a species of primitive minnow mayfly in the family Siphlonuridae. It is found in North America.
