= Siphlonurus mirus =

Scientific classification
- Domain: Eukaryota
- Kingdom: Animalia
- Phylum: Arthropoda
- Class: Insecta
- Order: Ephemeroptera
- Family: Siphlonuridae
- Genus: Siphlonurus
- Species: S. mirus

Binomial name
- Siphlonurus mirus (Eaton, 1885)

Synonyms
- Siphlurus mirus Eaton, 1885

Species of mayfly

Siphlonurus mirus is a species of primitive minnow mayfly in the family Siphlonuridae. It is found in North America.
