= Siphlonurus typicus =

Scientific classification
- Domain: Eukaryota
- Kingdom: Animalia
- Phylum: Arthropoda
- Class: Insecta
- Order: Ephemeroptera
- Family: Siphlonuridae
- Genus: Siphlonurus
- Species: S. typicus

Binomial name
- Siphlonurus typicus (Eaton, 1885)

Synonyms
- Siphlonurus berenice McDunnough, 1923; Siphlonurus novangliae McDunnough, 1924; Siphlurus typicus Eaton, 1885

Species of mayfly

Siphlonurus typicus is a species of primitive minnow mayfly in the family Siphlonuridae. It is found in North America.
