= Siphlonurus phyllis =

Scientific classification
- Domain: Eukaryota
- Kingdom: Animalia
- Phylum: Arthropoda
- Class: Insecta
- Order: Ephemeroptera
- Family: Siphlonuridae
- Genus: Siphlonurus
- Species: S. phyllis

Binomial name
- Siphlonurus phyllis McDunnough, 1923

Species of mayfly

Siphlonurus phyllis is a species of primitive minnow mayfly in the family Siphlonuridae. It is found in all of Canada and the northern United States.
