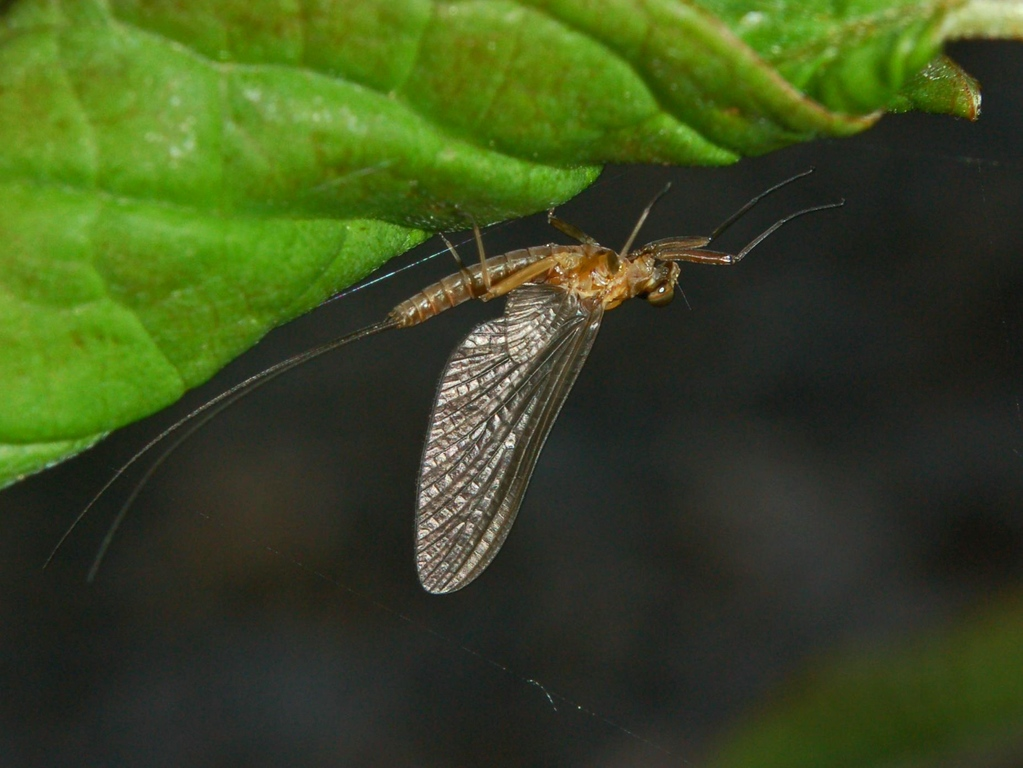

Scientific classification
- Domain: Eukaryota
- Kingdom: Animalia
- Phylum: Arthropoda
- Class: Insecta
- Order: Ephemeroptera
- Family: Siphlonuridae
- Genus: Siphlonurus
- Species: S. lacustris

Binomial name
- Siphlonurus lacustris (Eaton, 1870)

= Siphlonurus lacustris =

Species of mayfly

Siphlonurus lacustris is a species of mayfly belonging to the family Siphlonuridae. This species is present in most of Europe.

The adults of these aquatic insects reach 10–15 millimetres (0.39–0.59 in) of length and can mostly be encountered from early May through August, mainly in oxygenated waterways and in fresh water of lakes (hence the Latin name lacustris, meaning "lacustrine").

The basic coloration of the body is brown or gray-brown. On the head they have large compound eyes and three ocelli. The wings are held upright, they are triangular and translucent, with well drawn dark veins. The hindwings are much smaller than the forewings. The legs are long and thin. At the tip of the cylindrical abdomen they have two long cerci (about 20–25 millimetres (0.79–0.98 in) long).

Adults do not feed at all, as the reproduction is their main function. Their lifespan is very short, in the females lasts about 45 days, while in males usually no more than one day. The female lay the eggs on the water surface and leave them sink to the bottom. Nymphs are approximately10–12 millimetres (0.39–0.47 in) long. They live for about two years under rocks or buried in the mud, eating small invertebrates or small vegetables particles.
