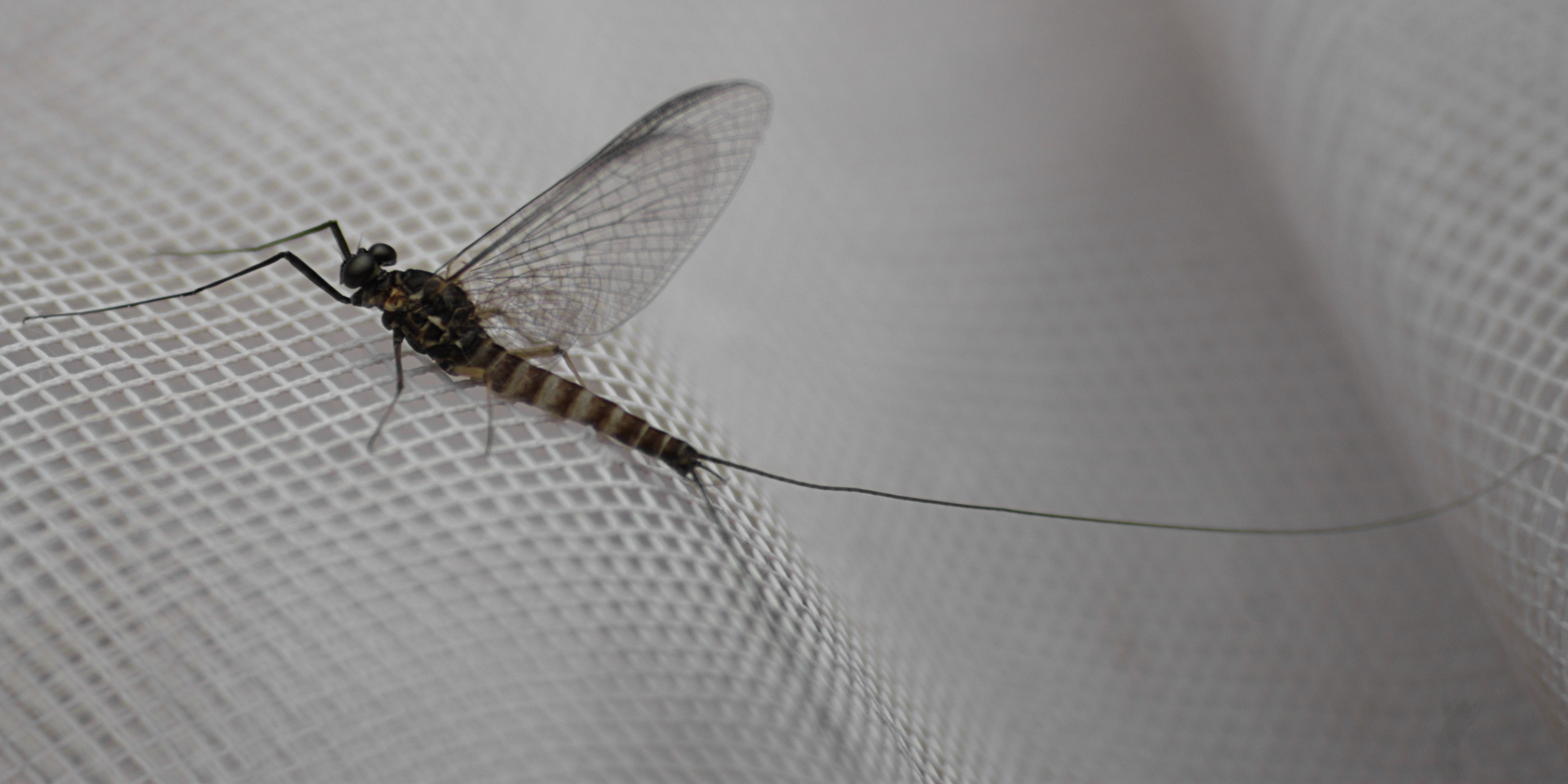

Scientific classification
- Domain: Eukaryota
- Kingdom: Animalia
- Phylum: Arthropoda
- Class: Insecta
- Order: Ephemeroptera
- Family: Siphlonuridae
- Genus: Siphlonurus
- Species: S. occidentalis

Binomial name
- Siphlonurus occidentalis (Eaton, 1885)

Synonyms
- Siphlonurus inflatus McDunnough, 1931; Siphlurus occidentalis Eaton, 1885

= Siphlonurus occidentalis =

Species of mayfly

Siphlonurus occidentalis is a species of primitive minnow mayfly in the family Siphlonuridae. It is found in Central America to North America. In North America its range includes southwestern, northern Canada, all of Mexico, the western United States, and Alaska.
