= Siphlonurus alternatus =

Scientific classification
- Domain: Eukaryota
- Kingdom: Animalia
- Phylum: Arthropoda
- Class: Insecta
- Order: Ephemeroptera
- Family: Siphlonuridae
- Genus: Siphlonurus
- Species: S. alternatus

Binomial name
- Siphlonurus alternatus (Say, 1824)

Synonyms
- Baetis alternatus Say, 1824; Baetis annulata Walker, 1853; Baetis annulatus Walker, 1853; Siphlonurus annulata (Walker, 1853)

Species of mayfly

Siphlonurus alternatus is a species of primitive minnow mayfly in the family Siphlonuridae. It is found in North America and Europe. In North America its range includes all of Canada, the northeastern United States, and Alaska.
