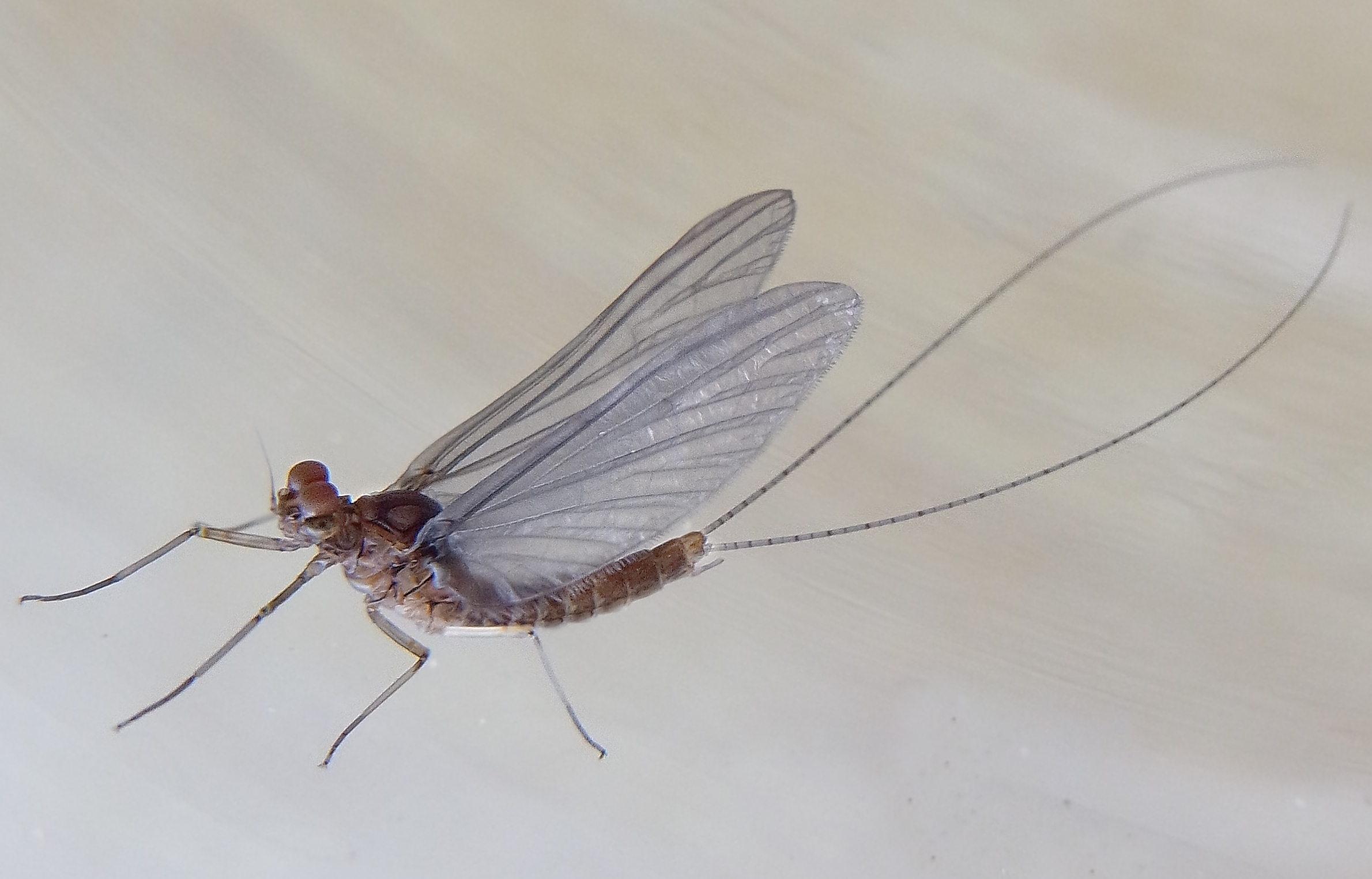
- Cloeon dipterum subimago

Scientific classification
- Domain: Eukaryota
- Kingdom: Animalia
- Phylum: Arthropoda
- Class: Insecta
- Order: Ephemeroptera
- Family: Baetidae
- Genus: Cloeon; Leach, 1815

Synonyms
- Austrocloeon Barnard, 1940; Cloe Burmeister, 1839; Cloeopsis Eaton, 1866; Intercloeon Kluge & Novikova, 1992; Similicloeon Kluge & Novikova, 1992; Austrocloeon Barnard, 1932 (nomen nudum)

= Cloeon =

Genus of mayflies

Cloeon is a cosmopolitan genus of mayflies of the family Baetidae.

== Species ==
The following are included in BioLib.cz:

1. Cloeon aeneum Barnard, 1932
2. Cloeon agnewi Hubbard, 1973
3. Cloeon amaniensis Gillies, 1985
4. Cloeon apicatum Navás, 1933
5. Cloeon areolatum Navás, 1930
6. Cloeon bellum Navás, 1931
7. Cloeon bimaculatum Eaton, 1883
8. Cloeon chaplini Barnard, 1932
9. Cloeon cognatum Stephens, 1836
10. Cloeon crassi Agnew, 1961
11. Cloeon degrangei Sowa, 1980
12. Cloeon dipterum (Linnaeus, 1761) (synonyms C. cognatum, C. inscriptum)
13. Cloeon durani Navás, 1926
14. Cloeon elevatum Agnew, 1961
15. Cloeon emmanueli Lugo-Ortiz & McCafferty, 1998
16. Cloeon fluviatile Ulmer, 1920
17. Cloeon gambiae Gillies, 1980
18. Cloeon harveyi (Kimmins, 1947)
19. Cloeon heterophillum Kluge & Novikova, 1992
20. Cloeon inscriptum Bengtsson, 1914
21. Cloeon lacunosum Barnard, 1932
22. Cloeon languidum Grandi, 1959
23. Cloeon macronyx Kluge & Novikova, 1992
24. Cloeon madhouae McCafferty & Mauremootoo, 2000
25. Cloeon marginale (Hagen, 1858)
26. Cloeon nana (Bogoescu, 1951)
27. Cloeon nandirum Harker, 1957
28. Cloeon paradieniense Suter, 1986
29. Cloeon paradieniensis Suter, 1986
30. Cloeon pennulatum Eaton, 1870
31. Cloeon perkinsi Barnard, 1932
32. Cloeon petropolitanum Kluge & Novikova, 1992
33. Cloeon pielinum Navás, 1933
34. Cloeon praetextum Bengtsson, 1914
35. Cloeon rhodesiae Barnard, 1932
36. Cloeon schoenemundi Bengtsson, 1936
37. Cloeon scitulum Kimmins, 1955
38. Cloeon simile Eaton, 1870
39. Cloeon smaeleni Lestage, 1924
40. Cloeon spiniventre Kluge & Novikova, 1992
41. Cloeon tanzaniae Gillies, 1985
42. Cloeon tasmaniae Tillyard, 1936
43. Cloeon unguiculatum Tshernova, 1941
44. Cloeon virens Klapálek, 1905
45. Cloeon virgiliae (Barnard, 1932)
46. Cloeon viridellum Lestage, 1923
- †Cloeon emmavillensis Riek, 1954
