= Procloeon viridoculare =

Scientific classification
- Domain: Eukaryota
- Kingdom: Animalia
- Phylum: Arthropoda
- Class: Insecta
- Order: Ephemeroptera
- Family: Baetidae
- Genus: Procloeon
- Species: P. viridoculare

Binomial name
- Procloeon viridoculare (Berner, 1940)

Synonyms
- Procloeon irrubrum Lowen and Flannagan, 1992

Species of mayfly

Procloeon viridoculare is a species of small minnow mayfly in the family Baetidae. It is found in North America.
