= Jurassonurus =

Jurassonurus Temporal range: Middle Jurassic

Scientific classification
- Kingdom: Animalia
- Phylum: Arthropoda
- Clade: Pancrustacea
- Class: Insecta
- Order: Ephemeroptera
- Family: Siphlonuridae
- Genus: Jurassonurus; Huang & Ren & Sinitshenkova, 2008
- Species: J. amoenus

Binomial name
- Jurassonurus amoenus Huang & Ren & Sinitshenkova, 2008

Extinct genus of mayflies

Jurassonurus is an extinct insect genus of mayflies (Ephemeroptera). This genus has only one member and that member has been scientifically named Jurassonurus amoenus which lived during the Middle Jurassic period 164.7 million to 155.7 million years ago in the Jiulongshan formation, Inner Mongolia, China.

== Taxonomy ==
The genus parent taxon is Siphlonuridae which itself is in the clade Tridentiseta which is part of the clade Ephemeroptera (Mayflies). Jurassonurus has many sister taxonomic clades which are as listed: Bolbonyx, Albisca, Mogzonurus, Triassonurus, Olgisca, Australurus, Cheirolgisca, Cretoneta, Dulcimanna, and many more.
