= Procloeon nelsoni =

Scientific classification
- Domain: Eukaryota
- Kingdom: Animalia
- Phylum: Arthropoda
- Class: Insecta
- Order: Ephemeroptera
- Family: Baetidae
- Genus: Procloeon
- Species: P. nelsoni

Binomial name
- Procloeon nelsoni Wiersema, 1999

Species of mayfly

Procloeon nelsoni is a species of small minnow mayfly in the family Baetidae. It is found in the southern United States.
