= Procloeon pennulatum =

Scientific classification
- Domain: Eukaryota
- Kingdom: Animalia
- Phylum: Arthropoda
- Class: Insecta
- Order: Ephemeroptera
- Family: Baetidae
- Genus: Procloeon
- Species: P. pennulatum

Binomial name
- Procloeon pennulatum (Eaton, 1870)

Species of mayfly

Procloeon pennulatum is a species of small minnow mayfly in the family Baetidae. It is found in North America.
