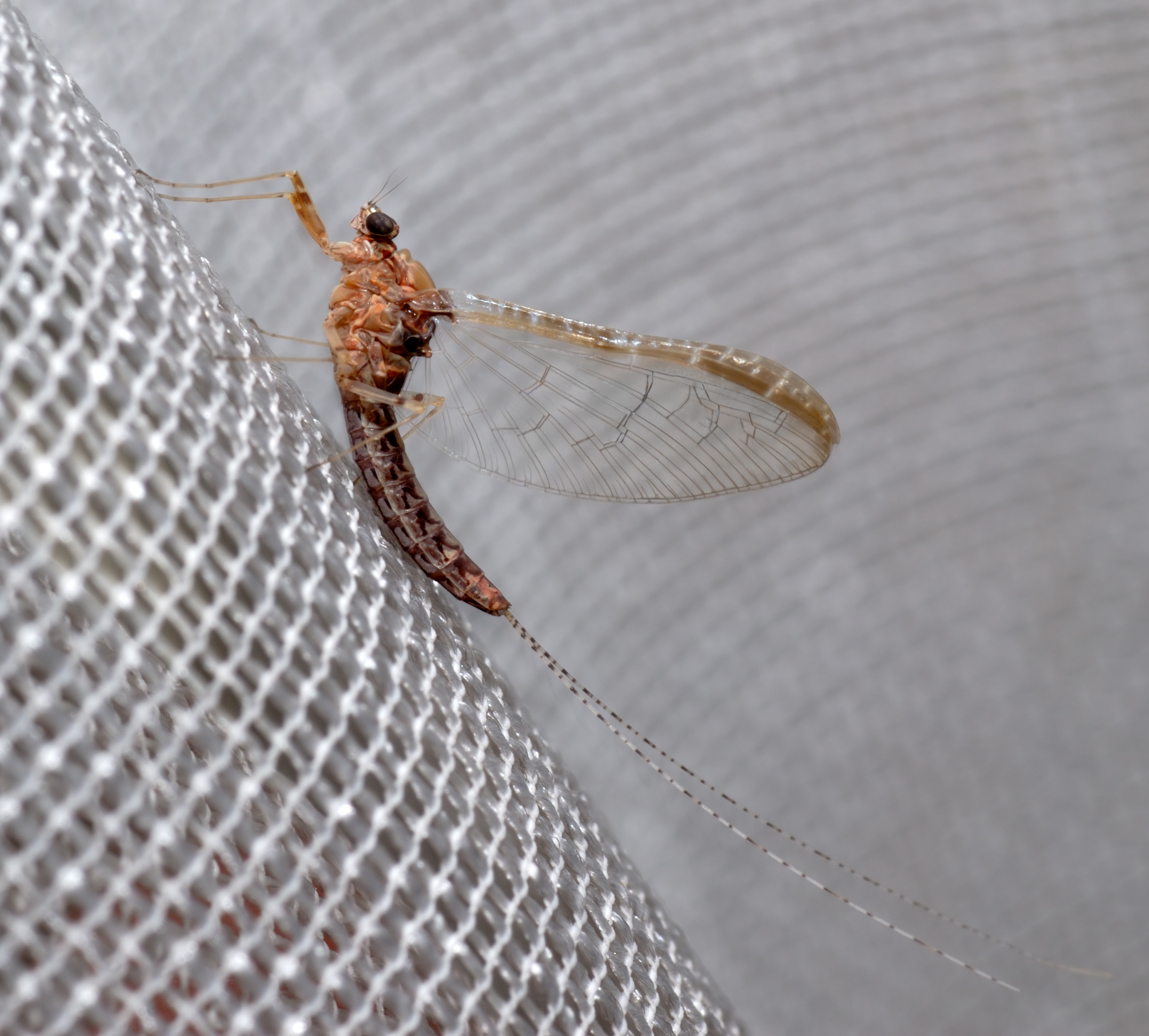
- Adult female
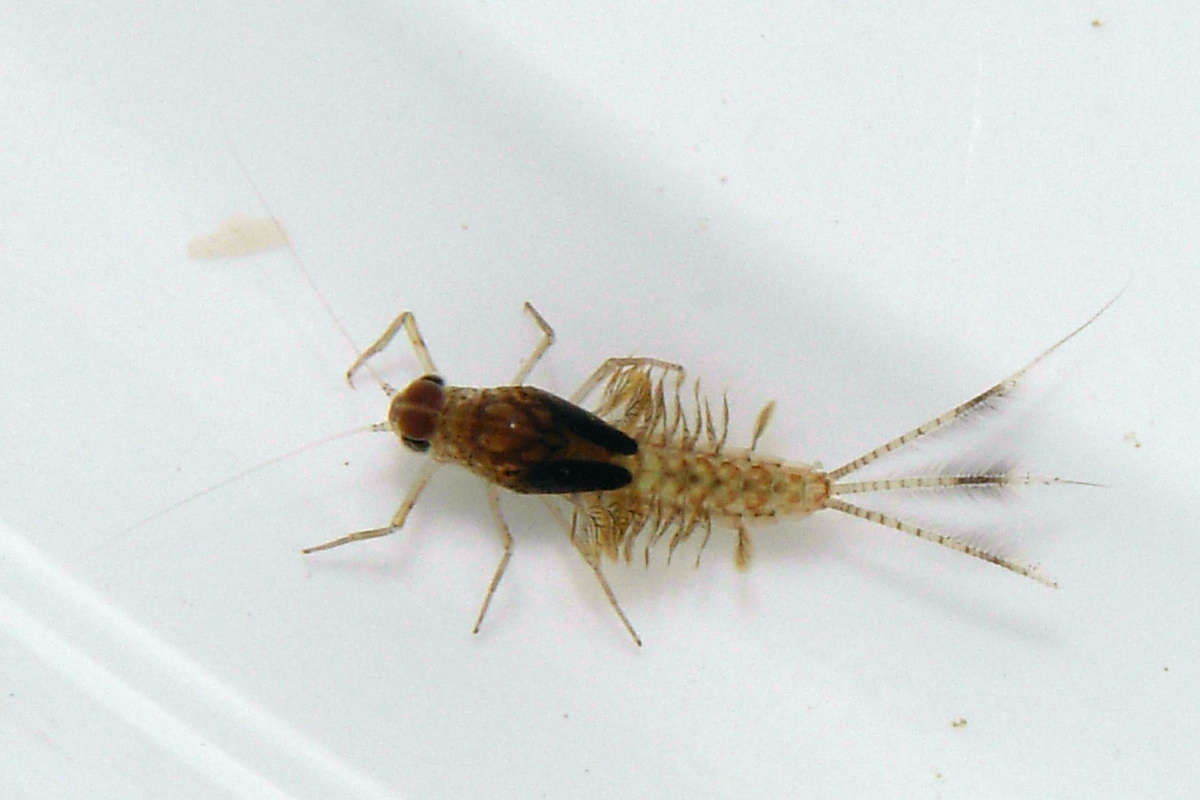
- Naiad (larva)

Scientific classification
- Kingdom: Animalia
- Phylum: Arthropoda
- Class: Insecta
- Order: Ephemeroptera
- Family: Baetidae
- Genus: Cloeon
- Species: C. dipterum

Binomial name
- Cloeon dipterum (Linnaeus, 1761)

Synonyms
- Ephemera diptera Linnaeus, 1761 (basionym); Ephemera annulata O. F. Müller, 1776; Ephemera rufula O. F. Müller, 1776; Ephemera dimidiata O. F. Müller, 1776; Cloeon pallida Leach, 1815; Cloeon marmoratum Curtis, 1834; Cloeon obscurum Curtis, 1834; Cloeon cognatum Stephens, 1835; Cloeon consobrinum Stephens, 1835; Cloeon virgo Stephens, 1835; Cloe affinis Rambur, 1842; Cloe apicalis Costa, 1882; Cloeon inscriptum Bengtsson, 1940; Cloeon szegedi Jacob, 1969

= Cloeon dipterum =

Species of mayfly

Cloeon dipterum is a species of mayfly with a Holarctic distribution. It is the most common mayfly in ponds in the British Isles and the only ovoviviparous mayfly in Europe. Males differ from females in having turbinate eyes.

== Description ==
In common with other members of the genera Cloeon and Procloeon, C. dipterum has a single pair of wings. This is also reflected in the specific epithet dipterum, which is from the Latin di-, meaning two, and the Greek pteron, meaning wing, and in his original description, Carl Linnaeus stated Inferiores alæ vix existunt ("smaller wings hardly present").

The compound eyes of C. dipterum show a striking sexual dimorphism, whereby females have lateral apposition eyes, while the males' eyes have an additional dorsal "turban-shaped" parts that function as superposition eyes. These extra eyes are thought to enable the males to locate isolated females in the mating swarm.

== Ecology and life cycle ==
Cloeon dipterum is unusual among mayflies in being ovoviviparous, and is the only ovoviviparous mayfly species known in Europe. Females lay eggs 10–14 days after mating, and the eggs hatch as soon as they hit the water. The larvae can survive for months in anoxic conditions, an adaptation which is necessary to survive the winter in ponds which freeze over and therefore contain little dissolved oxygen. In captivity, adult females have been kept alive for up to three weeks.

== Distribution and taxonomy ==
Cloeon dipterum was first described by Carl Linnaeus in the 2nd edition of his Fauna Suecica. Since then, Cloeon dipterum has been the recipient of unusually many taxonomic synonyms. Alongside new combinations of Linnaeus' original name in different genera (Ephemera, Chloeon, Cloe and Cloeopsis), true synonyms include three introduced by Otto Friedrich Müller in 1776 (E. annulatum, E. rufulum and E. dimidiatum), one by William Elford Leach in 1815 (C. pallidum), two by John Curtis in 1834 (C. marmoratum and C. obscurum), three by James Francis Stephens in 1835 (C. cognatum, C. consobrinum and C. virgo), and one each by Jules Pierre Rambur in 1842 (C. affinis), Costa in 1882 (C. apicalis), Bengtsson in 1940 (C. inscriptum) and Jacob in 1969 (C. szegedi).

Cloeon dipterum is widespread across Europe and Asia. In the British Isles, C. dipterum is the commonest mayfly in ponds, with around 40% of all ponds containing C. dipterum, rising to 70% in the south. In 1953, a single female Cloeon dipterum was discovered in Illinois, having not been previously recorded in North America, and was found near Lucas, Ohio in 1960. The species is now known to have a wide distribution in North America. Individuals of C. dipterum from Madeira are now placed in a different species, Cloeon peregrinator.

== See also ==
- List of mayflies of the British Isles
