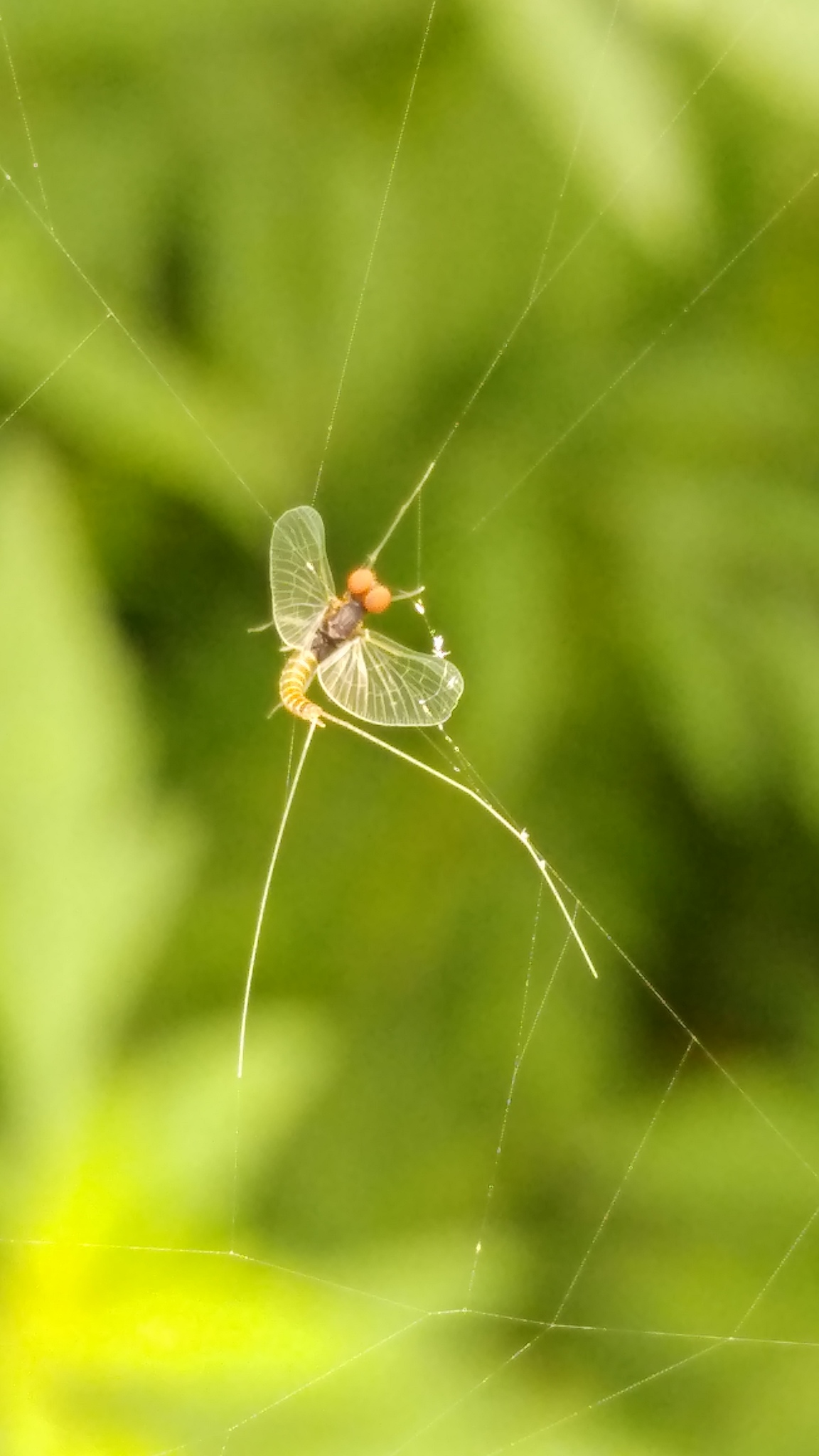

Conservation status
- Secure (NatureServe)

Scientific classification
- Kingdom: Animalia
- Phylum: Arthropoda
- Class: Insecta
- Order: Ephemeroptera
- Family: Baetidae
- Genus: Procloeon
- Species: P. rufostrigatum

Binomial name
- Procloeon rufostrigatum (McDunnough, 1924)

Synonyms
- Centroptilum rufostrigatum McDunnough, 1924; Centroptilum bistrigatum Daggy, 1945; Centroptilum hobbsi Berner, 1946; Procloeon hobbsi (Berner, 1946)

= Procloeon rufostrigatum =

Species of mayfly

Procloeon rufostrigatum, commonly known as Hobbs's small minnow mayfly, tiny sulphur dun, or baétis à stries rousses, is a species of mayfly in the family Baetidae. It is widespread across eastern North America.

== Distribution and habitat ==
Procloeon rufostrigatum has a wide distribution across eastern North America, including the provinces of Manitoba, New Brunswick, Nova Scotia, Ontario, Quebec, and Saskatchewan in Canada and the states of Alabama, Arkansas, Florida, Georgia, Illinois, Indiana, Iowa, Kansas, Kentucky, Maine, Maryland, Michigan, Minnesota, Mississippi, Missouri, Nebraska, New Hampshire, New York, North Carolina, North Dakota, Ohio, Pennsylvania, South Carolina, Texas, Vermont, Virginia, and Wisconsin in the United States.
