= Siphluriscidae =

Siphluriscidae Temporal range: Middle Jurassic–Present

Scientific classification
- Kingdom: Animalia
- Phylum: Arthropoda
- Class: Insecta
- Order: Ephemeroptera
- Family: Siphluriscidae; Zhou and Peters, 2003

Genera
- Siphluriscus; †Stackelbergisca

Family of mayflies

Siphluriscidae is a family of mayflies. It contains a single extant species, Siphluriscus chinensis, which is native to Vietnam and China. It is thought to be the most primitive living lineage of mayflies. A fossil genus, Stackelbergisca is known from several species from the Jurassic and Early Cretaceous of Asia. A second species of Siphluriscus, S. davidi was later assigned to the genus Siphlonurus.

== Taxonomy ==
- Siphluriscus Ulmer, 1920
  - Siphluriscus chinensis Ulmer, 1920 China, Vietnam
- †Stackelbergisca Tshernova 1967
  - †Stackelbergisca clara Sinitshenkova 2000 Doronino Formation, Russia, Early Cretaceous (Barremian)
  - †Stackelbergisca cylindrata Zhang 2006 Daohugou, China, Middle Jurassic
  - †Stackelbergisca shaburensis Sinitshenkova 1991 Ichetuy Formation, Russia, Late Jurassic (Oxfordian)
  - †Stackelbergisca sibirica Tshernova 1967 Uda Formation, Russia, Late Jurassic (Oxfordian/Kimmeridgian)
