= Ametropus =

Scientific classification
- Domain: Eukaryota
- Kingdom: Animalia
- Phylum: Arthropoda
- Class: Insecta
- Order: Ephemeroptera
- Family: Ametropodidae
- Genus: Ametropus; Albarda, 1878

Genus of insects

Ametropus is a genus of sand minnows in the family Ametropodidae. There are at least three described species in Ametropus.

== Species ==
These three species belong to the genus Ametropus:

- Ametropus ammophilus Allen & Edmunds, 1976
- Ametropus fragilis Albarda, 1878
- Ametropus neavei McDunnough, 1928
