= Cloeon praetextum =

Scientific classification
- Domain: Eukaryota
- Kingdom: Animalia
- Phylum: Arthropoda
- Class: Insecta
- Order: Ephemeroptera
- Family: Baetidae
- Genus: Cloeon
- Species: C. praetextum

Binomial name
- Cloeon praetextum Bengtsson, 1914

Species of mayfly

Cloeon praetextum is a species of small minnow mayfly in the family Baetidae. It is found in Europe.
