= Cloeon languidum =

Scientific classification
- Domain: Eukaryota
- Kingdom: Animalia
- Phylum: Arthropoda
- Class: Insecta
- Order: Ephemeroptera
- Family: Baetidae
- Genus: Cloeon
- Species: C. languidum

Binomial name
- Cloeon languidum Grandi, 1959

Species of mayfly

Cloeon languidum is a species of small minnow mayfly in the family Baetidae.
