= Procloeon rubropictum =

Scientific classification
- Domain: Eukaryota
- Kingdom: Animalia
- Phylum: Arthropoda
- Class: Insecta
- Order: Ephemeroptera
- Family: Baetidae
- Genus: Procloeon
- Species: P. rubropictum

Binomial name
- Procloeon rubropictum (McDunnough, 1923)

Synonyms
- Cloeon rubropictum McDunnough, 1923

Species of mayfly

Procloeon rubropictum is a species of small minnow mayfly in the family Baetidae. It is found in the southern half of Canada and the eastern United States.
