= Cloeon virens =

Scientific classification
- Domain: Eukaryota
- Kingdom: Animalia
- Phylum: Arthropoda
- Class: Insecta
- Order: Ephemeroptera
- Family: Baetidae
- Genus: Cloeon
- Species: C. virens

Binomial name
- Cloeon virens Klapalek, 1905

Species of mayfly

Cloeon virens is a species of small minnow mayfly in the family Baetidae.
