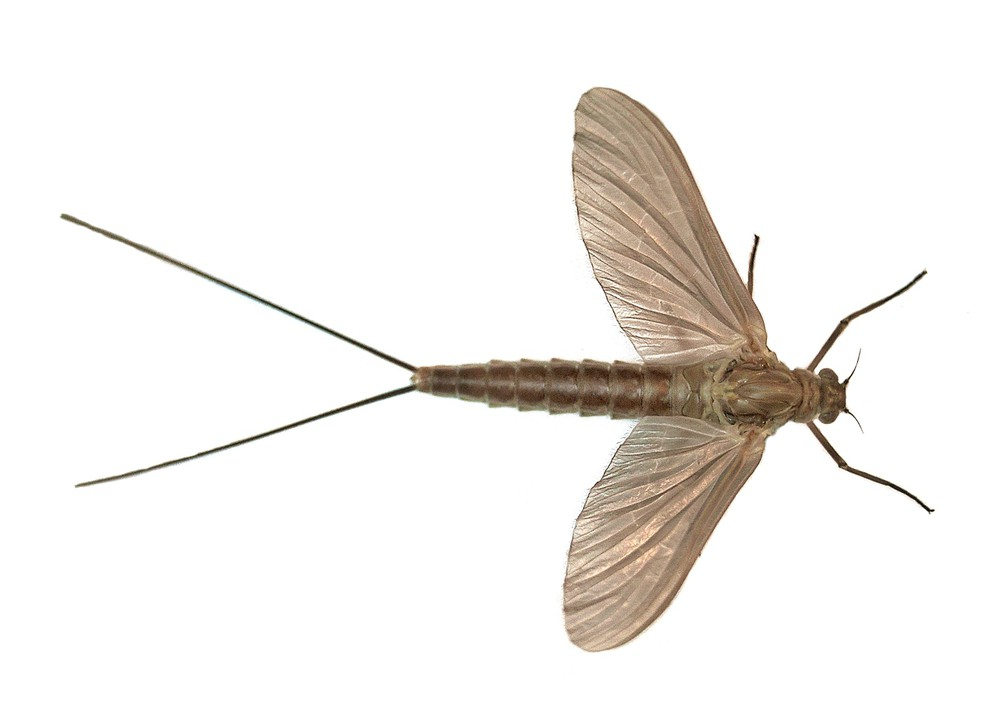
- A female, Arnhem, the Netherlands

Scientific classification
- Domain: Eukaryota
- Kingdom: Animalia
- Phylum: Arthropoda
- Class: Insecta
- Order: Ephemeroptera
- Family: Baetidae
- Genus: Cloeon
- Species: C. simile

Binomial name
- Cloeon simile Eaton, 1870

= Cloeon simile =

Species of insect (mayfly) found in Europe

Cloeon simile is a species of small minnow mayfly in the family Baetidae. It is found in Europe.
