= Cloeon petropolitanum =

Scientific classification
- Kingdom: Animalia
- Phylum: Arthropoda
- Class: Insecta
- Order: Ephemeroptera
- Family: Baetidae
- Genus: Cloeon
- Species: C. petropolitanum

Binomial name
- Cloeon petropolitanum Kluge & Novikova, 1992

Species of mayfly

Cloeon petropolitanum is a species of small minnow mayfly in the family Baetidae.
