= Cloeon fluviatile =

Scientific classification
- Domain: Eukaryota
- Kingdom: Animalia
- Phylum: Arthropoda
- Class: Insecta
- Order: Ephemeroptera
- Family: Baetidae
- Genus: Cloeon
- Species: C. fluviatile

Binomial name
- Cloeon fluviatile Ulmer, 1920

Species of mayfly

Cloeon fluviatile is a species of small minnow mayfly in the family Baetidae.
