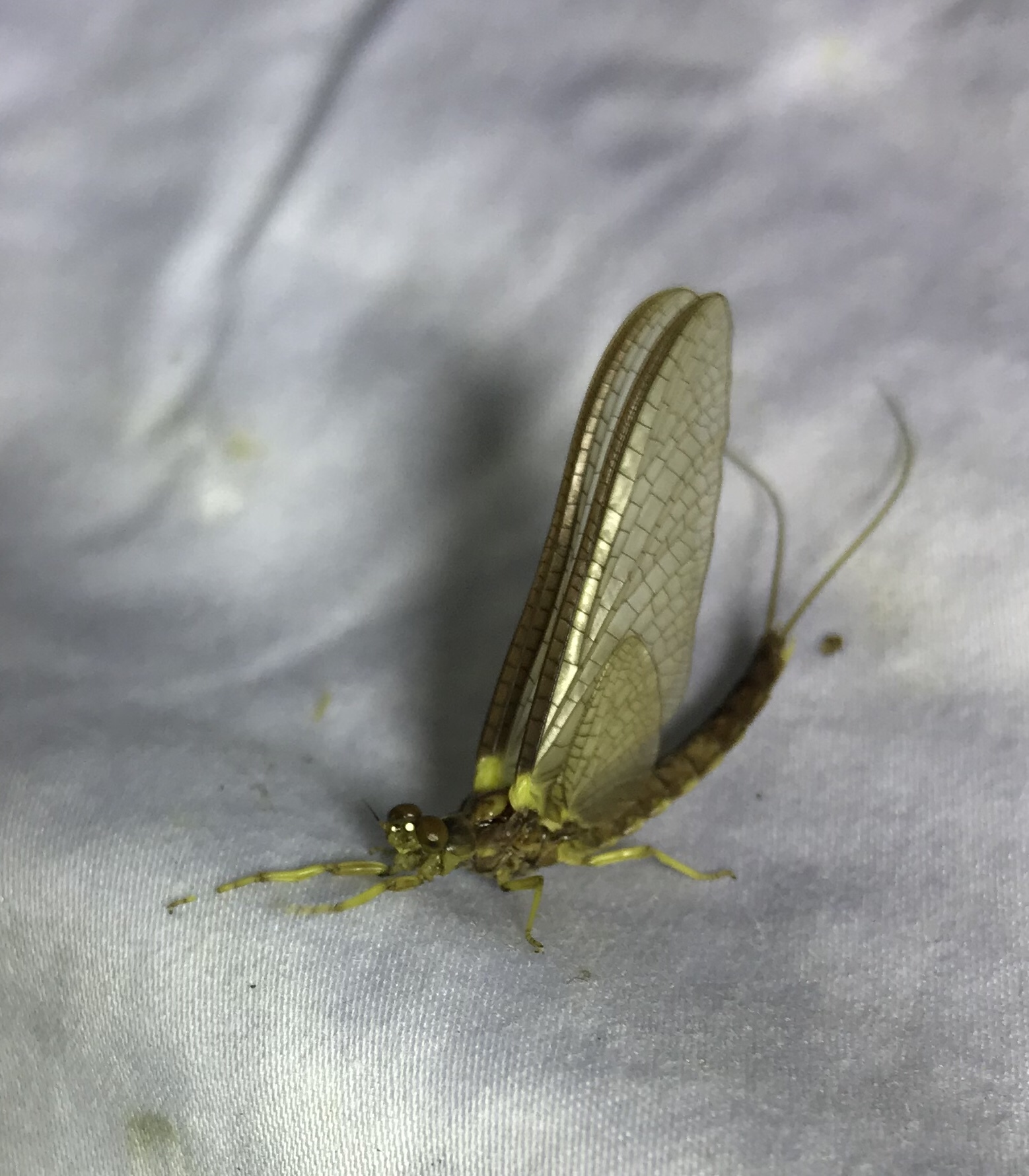
- Coloburiscus, New Zealand

Scientific classification
- Domain: Eukaryota
- Kingdom: Animalia
- Phylum: Arthropoda
- Class: Insecta
- Order: Ephemeroptera
- Suborder: Pisciforma
- Superfamily: Heptagenioidea
- Family: Coloburiscidae (Edmunds 1963)

= Coloburiscidae =

Family of mayflies

Coloburiscidae is a family of mayflies in the order Ephemeroptera, with at least seven species in three genera native to Australia, New Zealand, and Chile.

== Genera ==
These three genera belong to the family Coloburiscidae:

- Coloburiscoides Lestage, 1935 - Australia
- Coloburiscus Eaton, 1888 - New Zealand
- Murphyella Lestage, 1930 - Chile
