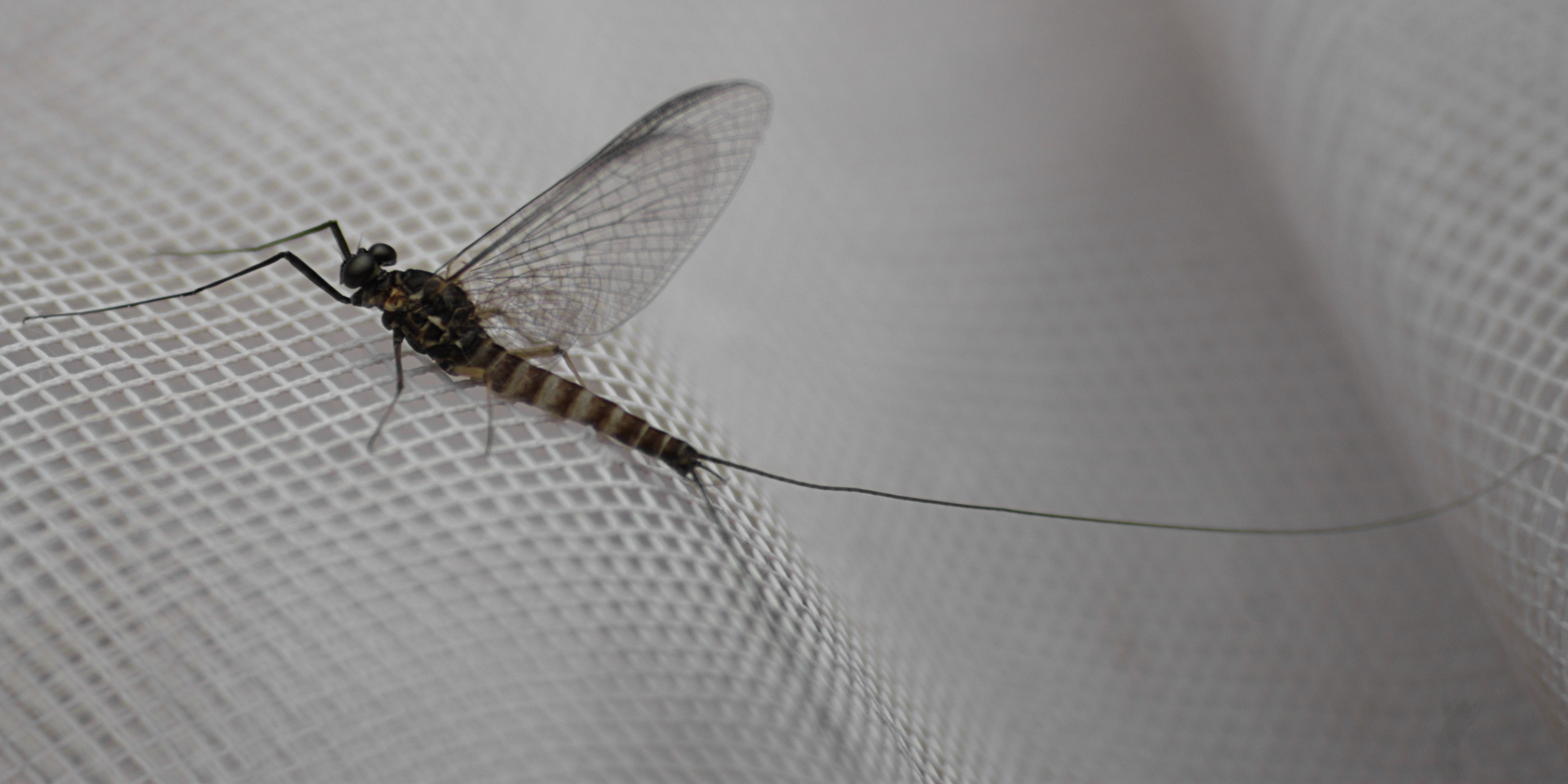
- Siphlonurus occidentalis

Scientific classification
- Domain: Eukaryota
- Kingdom: Animalia
- Phylum: Arthropoda
- Class: Insecta
- Order: Ephemeroptera
- Family: Siphlonuridae
- Genus: Siphlonurus; Eaton, 1868

= Siphlonurus =

Genus of mayflies

Siphlonurus is a genus of primitive minnow mayflies in the family Siphlonuridae. There are more than 40 described species in Siphlonurus.

== Species ==
These 43 species belong to the genus Siphlonurus:

- Siphlonurus abraxas Jacob, 1968
- Siphlonurus aestivalis (Eaton, 1903)
- Siphlonurus alternatus (Say, 1824)
- Siphlonurus armatus Eaton, 1870
- Siphlonurus autumnalis McDunnough, 1931
- Siphlonurus barbaroides McDunnough, 1929
- Siphlonurus barbarus McDunnough, 1924
- Siphlonurus binotatus (Eaton, 1892)
- Siphlonurus chankae Tshernova, 1952
- Siphlonurus columbianus McDunnough, 1925
- Siphlonurus croaticus Ulmer, 1920
- Siphlonurus davidi (Navás, 1932)
- Siphlonurus decorus Traver, 1932
- Siphlonurus demarayi Kondratieff & Voshell, 1981
- Siphlonurus flavidus (Pictet, 1865)
- Siphlonurus griseus (Navás, 1912)
- Siphlonurus hispanicus Demoulin, 1958
- Siphlonurus immanis Kluge, 1985
- Siphlonurus irenae Alba-Tercedor, 1990
- Siphlonurus lacustris Eaton, 1870
- Siphlonurus luridipennis (Burmeister, 1839)
- Siphlonurus lusoensis Puthz, 1977
- Siphlonurus marginatus Traver, 1932
- Siphlonurus marshalli Traver, 1934
- Siphlonurus minnoi Provonsha & McCafferty, 1982
- Siphlonurus mirus (Eaton, 1885)
- Siphlonurus montanus Studemann, 1992
- Siphlonurus muchei Braasch, 1983
- Siphlonurus noveboracanus (Lichtenstein, 1796)
- Siphlonurus occidentalis (Eaton, 1885)
- Siphlonurus palaearcticus (Tshernova, 1930)
- Siphlonurus phyllis McDunnough, 1923
- Siphlonurus quebecensis (Provancher, 1878)
- Siphlonurus rapidus McDunnough, 1924
- Siphlonurus sanukensis (Takahashi, 1929)
- Siphlonurus securifer McDunnough, 1926
- Siphlonurus spectabilis Traver, 1934
- Siphlonurus typicus (Eaton, 1885)
- Siphlonurus yoshinoensis (Gose, 1979)
- Siphlonurus zhelochovtsevi Tshernova, 1952
- † Siphlonurus dubiosus Demoulin, 1968
