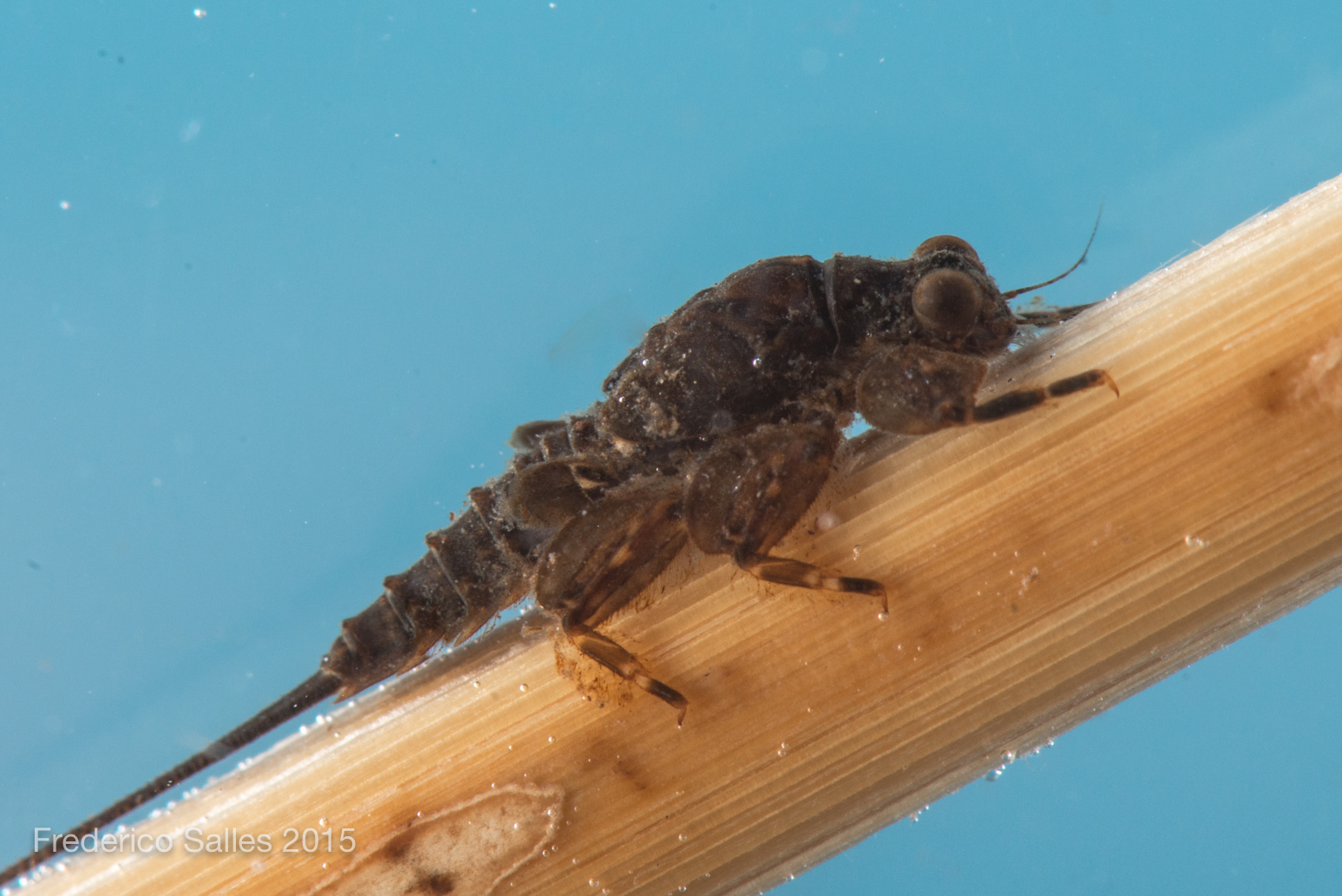
- Nymph of Melanemerella brasiliana

Scientific classification
- Kingdom: Animalia
- Phylum: Arthropoda
- Class: Insecta
- Order: Ephemeroptera
- Family: Melanemerellidae
- Genus: Melanemerella; Ulmer, 1920

Type species
- Melanemerella brasiliana Ulmer, 1920

= Melanemerella =

Genus of insects

Melanemerella is a genus of mayfly belonging to Ephemerelloidea. It is endemic to Brazil, and is the only member of the family Melanemerellidae.
