= Euthyplociidae =

Scientific classification
- Domain: Eukaryota
- Kingdom: Animalia
- Phylum: Arthropoda
- Class: Insecta
- Order: Ephemeroptera
- Family: Euthyplociidae

Family of mayflies

Euthyplociidae is a family of mayflies in the order Ephemeroptera. There are approximately 7 genera and more than 20 described species in Euthyplociidae.

== Genera ==
These seven genera belong to the family Euthyplociidae:

- Afroplocia Lestage, 1939
- Campylocia Needham & Murphy, 1924
- Euthyplocia Eaton, 1871
- Exeuthyplocia Lestage, 1919
- Mesoplocia
- Polyplocia Lestage, 1921
- Proboscidoplocia Demoulin, 1966
