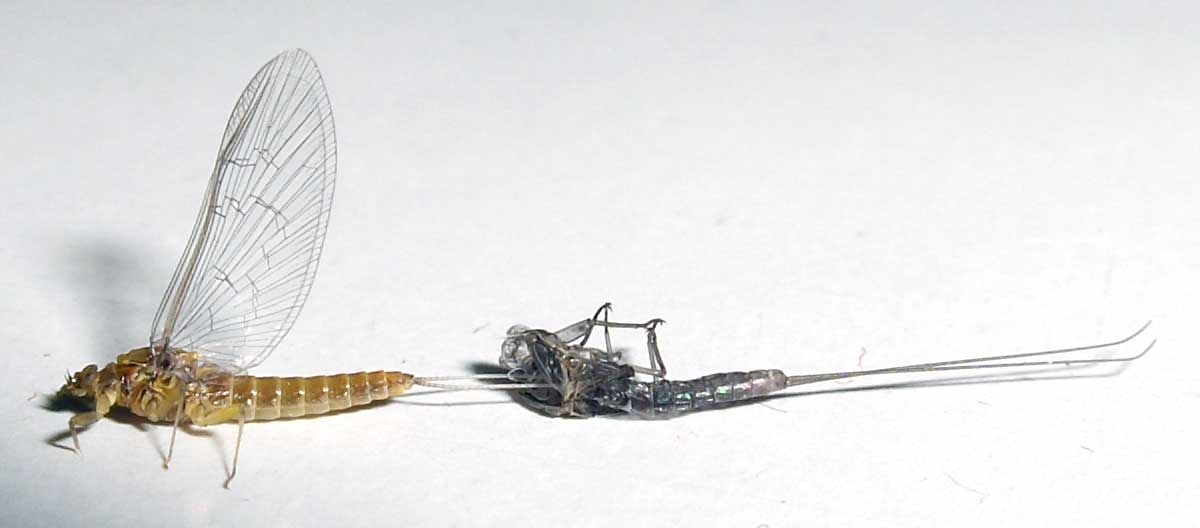
- A baetid mayfly (Cloeon sp. or Procloeon sp.) emerging from its exuvia.

Scientific classification
- Domain: Eukaryota
- Kingdom: Animalia
- Phylum: Arthropoda
- Class: Insecta
- Order: Ephemeroptera
- Family: Baetidae
- Subfamily: Baetinae
- Genus: Procloeon; Bengtsson, 1915

= Procloeon =

Genus of mayflies

Procloeon is a genus of small minnow mayflies in the family Baetidae. There are at least 20 described species in Procloeon, recorded from Africa, Europe, parts of S and SE Asia (probably incomplete distribution) and North America.

== Species ==
- Procloeon bellum (McDunnough, 1924)
- Procloeon caliginosum (McDunnough, 1925)
- Procloeon fragile (McDunnough, 1923)
- Procloeon inanum (McDunnough, 1924)
- Procloeon ingens (McDunnough, 1923)
- Procloeon insignificans (McDunnough, 1925)
- Procloeon intermediale (McDunnough, 1931)
- Procloeon mendax (Walsh, 1862)
- Procloeon nelsoni Wiersema, 1999
- Procloeon ozburni (McDunnough, 1924)
- Procloeon pennulatum (Eaton, 1870)
- Procloeon quaesitum (McDunnough, 1931)
- Procloeon rivulare (Traver, 1935)
- Procloeon rubropictum (McDunnough, 1923)
- Procloeon rufostrigatum (McDunnough, 1924)
- Procloeon simile (McDunnough, 1924)
- Procloeon simplex (McDunnough, 1925)
- Procloeon texanum McCafferty and Provonsha, 1993
- Procloeon venosum (Traver, 1935)
- Procloeon vicinum (Hagen, 1861)
- Procloeon viridoculare (Berner, 1940)
