= Ametropodidae =

Scientific classification
- Domain: Eukaryota
- Kingdom: Animalia
- Phylum: Arthropoda
- Class: Insecta
- Order: Ephemeroptera
- Suborder: Pisciforma
- Family: Ametropodidae

Family of mayflies

Ametropodidae is a family of mayflies in the order Ephemeroptera. There are at least three genera and three described species in Ametropodidae.

== Genera ==
These three genera belong to the family Ametropodidae:

- Ametropus Albarda, 1878^{i c g b}
- Brevitibia Demoulin, 1968^{g}
- Palaeometropus Sinitshenkova, 2000^{g}

Data sources: i = ITIS, c = Catalogue of Life, g = GBIF, b = Bugguide.net
