= Outgert Cluyt =

Outgert Cluyt or Outger Kluijt Latinized as Augerius Clutius (1575 – 1636) was a Dutch physician and naturalist. He trained in medicine which also involved studying medicinal plants. In addition he studied insects and is best known for his work on mayflies titled Opuscula duo singularia. II. De Hemerobio sive Ephemero Insecta (1634). It was based on actual observation and did not follow the usual traditional repetition of old and incorrect information. The plant genus Clutia was named in his honour.

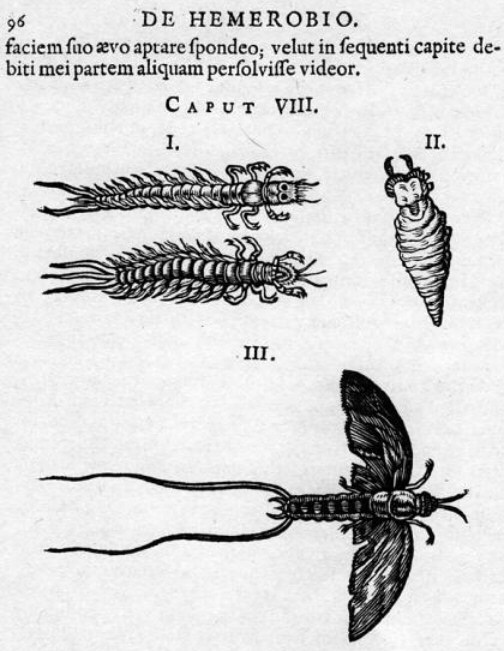
Illustrations

Cluyt was born in Delft and grew up in Leiden when his father moved in 1594 to work at the university. His father was the pharmacist and botanist Dirck Outgaertszoon Cluyt (1546 - 1598) Latinized as Theodorus Clutius. He grew up observing medicinal plants and meeting botanists like Clusius who worked with father. He studied at Leiden University from 1594 and went to Montpellier in 1601 to study medicine and worked with Richer de Belleval. He travelled through Europe after his medical studies visiting botanical gardens in France and Spain. He travelled to North Africa where he was captured by pirates, escaped, and became a physician in Amsterdam from 1607. He wrote pamphlets on kidney stones (1526), on the transport of plant material (1631), mayflies and the Maldives coconut (1634). He had become interested in insects, after he received the notes on insects made by Johannes Dortman, a pharmacist and politician. In 1619 Dortman noticed the swarming of mayflies over the Ijssel river near Zutphen. Dortman had confused mayfly larvae with the larvae of beetles known as mayworms. Clutius was interested in medicinal extracts from insects and he learned about the beetle extract that is now known to be cantharidin. Clutius was able to separate the mayfly larvae and the blister beetle larvae. Clutius saw mayfly larvae and illustrated them. The image has been identified as belonging to Palingenia longicauda.

Cluyt was married first to Haesje Pieters and in 1613 he married Susanna Spranger (d. 1651), sister of the art collector Gommer Spranger. A younger brother of Cluyt, Willem, was an Amsterdam notary. Cluyt was buried on October 6, 1636.
