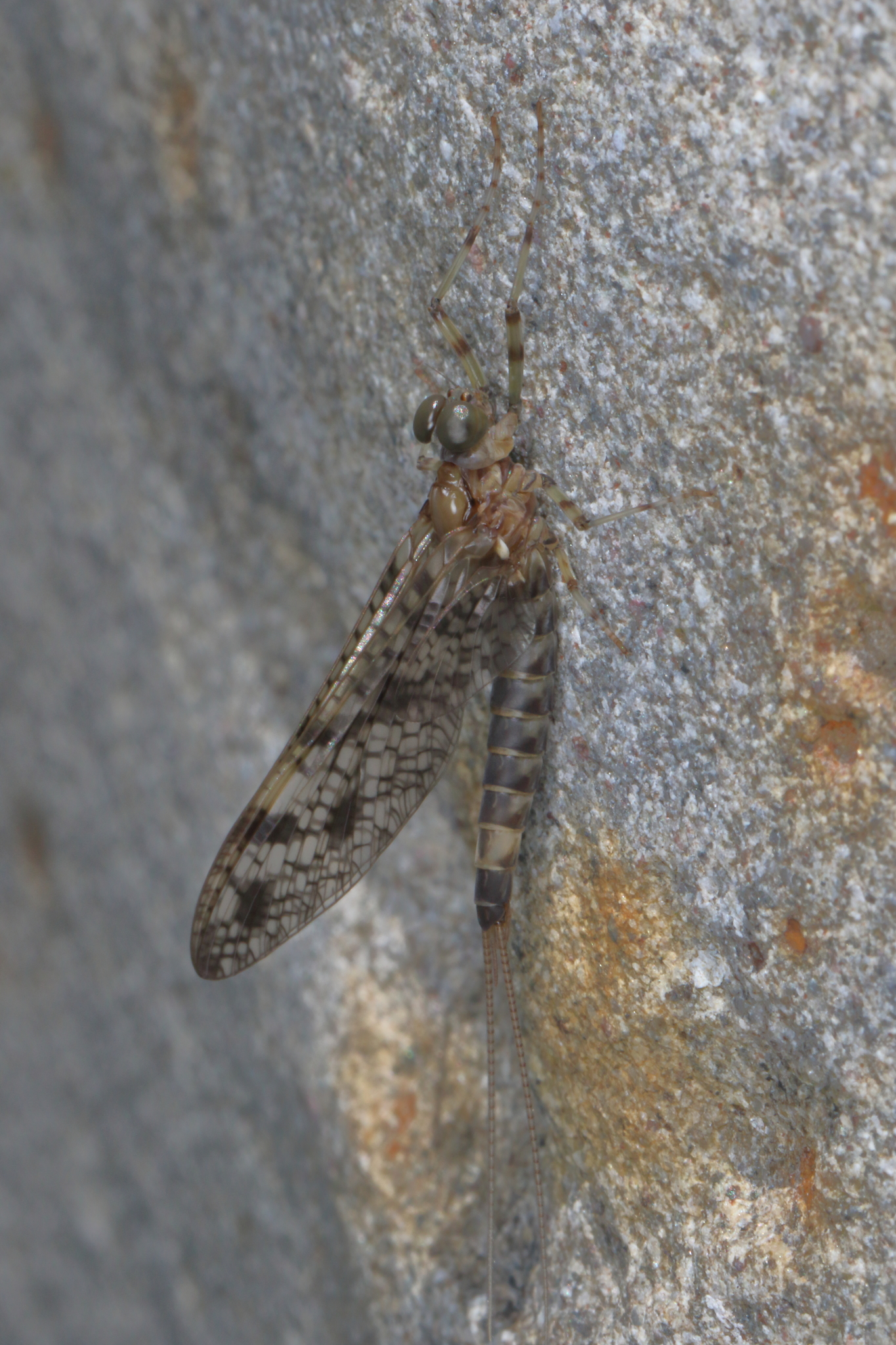
- Nesameletus, Arthur's Pass, New Zealand

Scientific classification
- Domain: Eukaryota
- Kingdom: Animalia
- Phylum: Arthropoda
- Class: Insecta
- Order: Ephemeroptera
- Family: Nesameletidae

= Nesameletidae =

Family of mayflies

Nesameletidae is a family of mayflies in the order Ephemeroptera. There are at least three genera and about eight described species in Nesameletidae.

== Genera ==
These three genera belong to the family Nesameletidae:

- Ameletoides Tillyard, 1933 – Australia
- Metamonius Eaton, 1885 – South America
- Nesameletus Tillyard, 1933 – New Zealand
