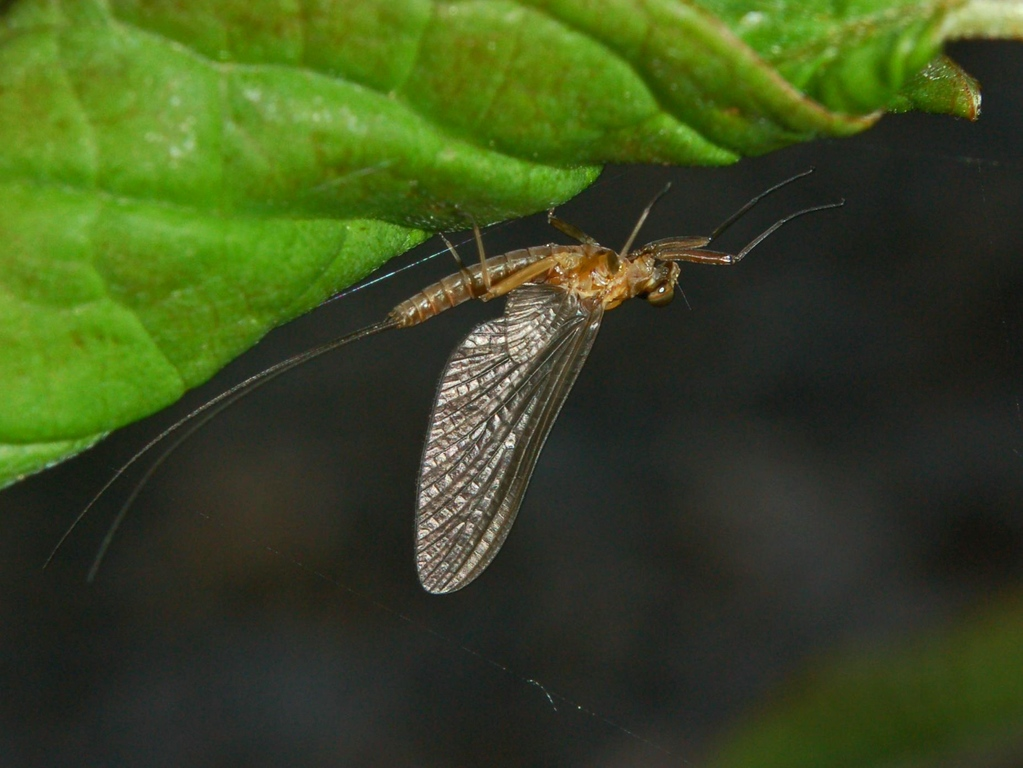

Scientific classification
- Kingdom: Animalia
- Phylum: Arthropoda
- Clade: Pancrustacea
- Class: Insecta
- Order: Ephemeroptera
- Suborder: Schistonota
- Superfamily: Baetoidea
- Family: Siphlonuridae

= Siphlonuridae =

Siphlonuridae Temporal range: Anisian–Holocene, 242–0 Ma

Family of mayflies

Siphlonuridae, also known as the primitive minnow mayfly, is a family of insects belonging to the order Ephemeroptera. They are adapted to cool waters.

== Taxonomy ==
The family is divided into the following extant genera:

1. Ameletoides Tillyard, 1933
2. Edmundsius Day, 1953
3. Parameletus Bengtsson, 1908
4. Siphlonisca Needham, 1909
5. Siphlonurus Eaton, 1868

The following extinct genera are members of the family Siphlonuridae:

† Albisca Sinitshenkova 1989
† Australurus Jell & Duncan (1986)
† Bolbonyx Sinitshenkova (1990)
† Cheirolgisca Lin & Huang (2008)
† Cretoneta Tshernova 1971
† Dulcimanna Jell & Duncan (1986)
† Huizhougenia Lin (1980)
† Jurassonurus Huang et al. (2008)
† Mesobaetis Brauer et al. (1889)
† Mogzonurella Sinitshenkova (1985)
† Mogzonurus Sinitshenkova (1985)
† Multiramificans Huang et al. (2007)
† Olgisca Demoulin (1970)
† Proameletus Sinitshenkova (1976)
† Promirara Jell & Duncan (1986)
† Siphangarus Sinitshenkova (2000)
† Triassonurus Sinitshenkova & Marchal-Papier (2005)

== Family overview ==
The labrum (upper lip) is not notched in the middle; the antennae are shorter than twice the width of the head; the maxillae on the underside of the head lack prominent rows of golden spines; the abdominal gills are rounded and similar to each other in structure; three long slender filaments at the end of the body are about equally long.
