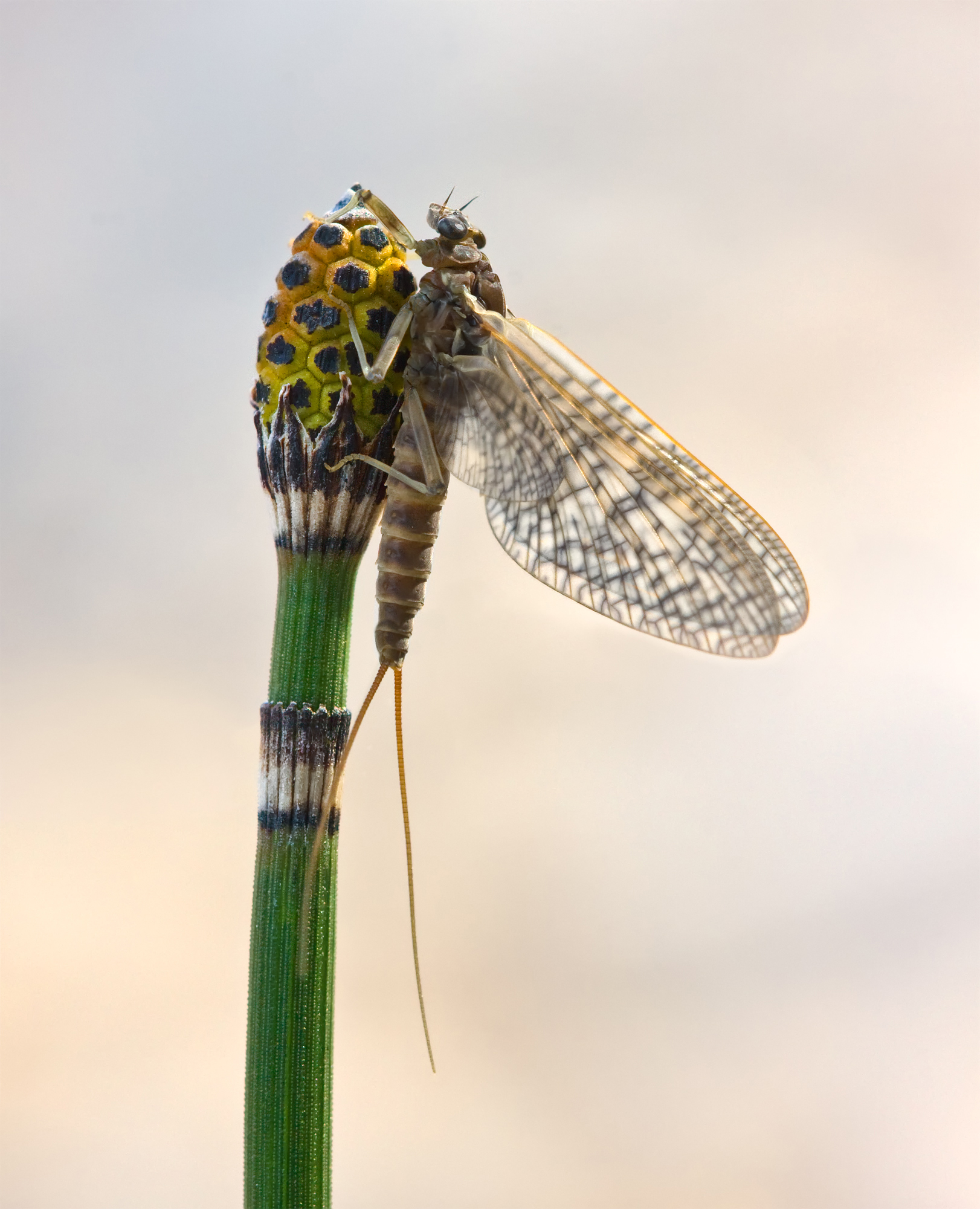
- Rhithrogena germanica, the fly fisherman's "March brown mayfly"

Scientific classification
- Kingdom: Animalia
- Phylum: Arthropoda
- Clade: Pancrustacea
- Class: Insecta
- Subclass: Pterygota
- Infraclass: Palaeoptera
- Superorder: Ephemeropteroidea; Rohdendorf, 1968
- Order: Ephemeroptera; Hyatt & Arms, 1890

Suborders and families
- See text

= Mayfly =

Mayfly Temporal range: Late Carboniferous–present

Aquatic insects of the order Ephemeroptera

Mayflies (also up-winged flies or up-wing flies, or drake-flies in the UK; shadflies or fishflies in the northern U.S. and Canada (Note: Also upper Midwestern US, by Canadian soldiers in the American Great Lakes region.)) are aquatic insects belonging to the order Ephemeroptera. This order is part of an ancient group of insects termed the Palaeoptera, which also contains dragonflies and damselflies. Over 3,000 species of mayfly are known worldwide, grouped into over 400 genera in 42 families.

Mayflies have long tails and wings that flat over the abdomen. Their immature stages are aquatic fresh water forms (called "naiads" or "nymphs"), whose presence indicates a clean, unpolluted and highly oxygenated aquatic environment. They are unique among insect orders in having a fully winged terrestrial preadult stage, the subimago, which moults into a sexually mature adult, the imago.

Mayflies "hatch" (emerge as adults) from spring to autumn, not necessarily in May, in enormous numbers. Some hatches attract tourists. Fly fishermen make use of mayfly hatches by choosing artificial fishing flies that resemble them. One of the most famous English mayflies is Rhithrogena germanica, the fisherman's "March brown mayfly".

The brief lives of mayfly adults have been noted by naturalists and encyclopaedists since Aristotle and Pliny the Elder in classical antiquity. The German engraver Albrecht Dürer included a mayfly in his 1495 engraving The Holy Family with the Mayfly to suggest a link between heaven and earth. The English poet George Crabbe compared the brief life of a daily newspaper with that of a mayfly in the satirical poem "The Newspaper" (1785), both being known as "ephemera".

== Description ==
=== Nymph ===
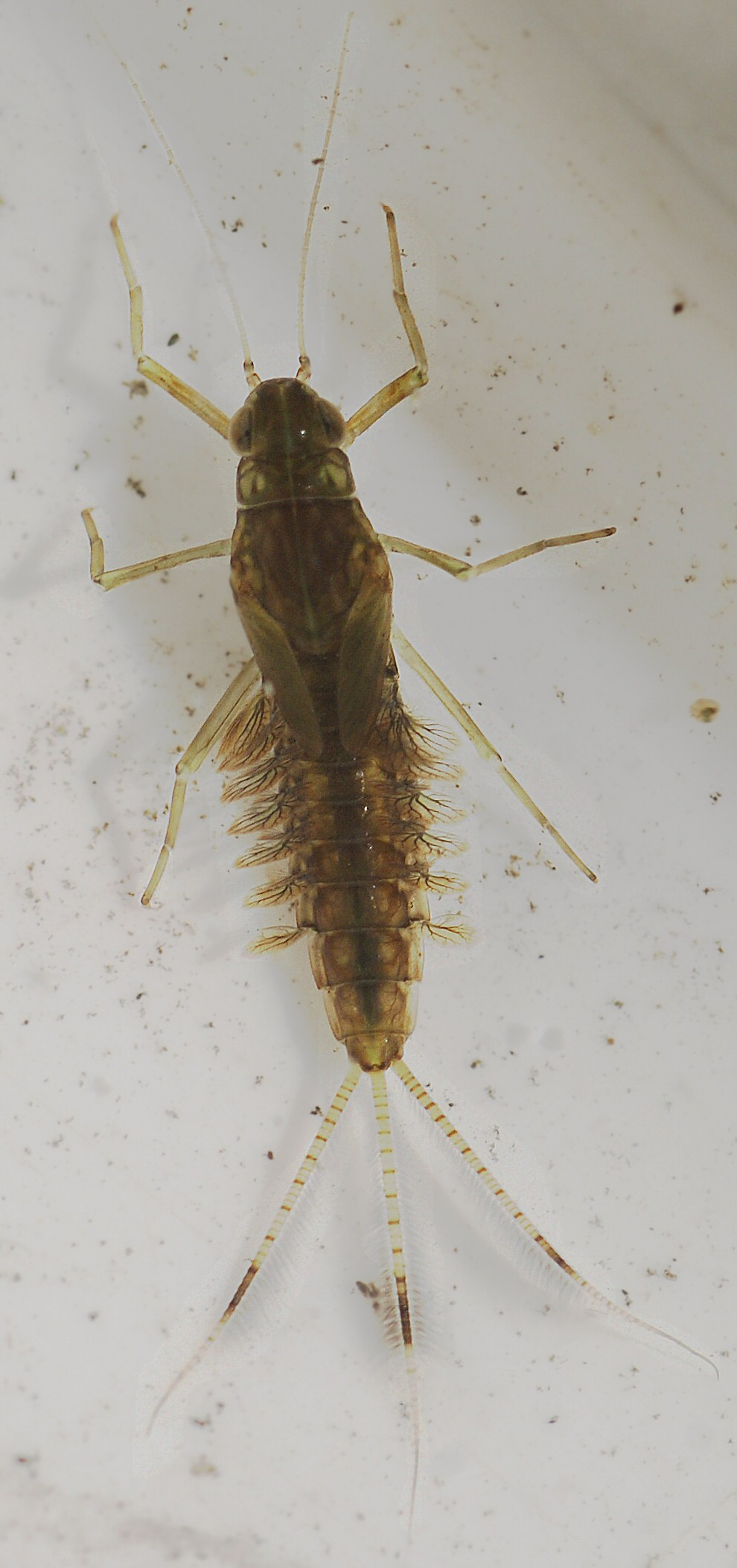
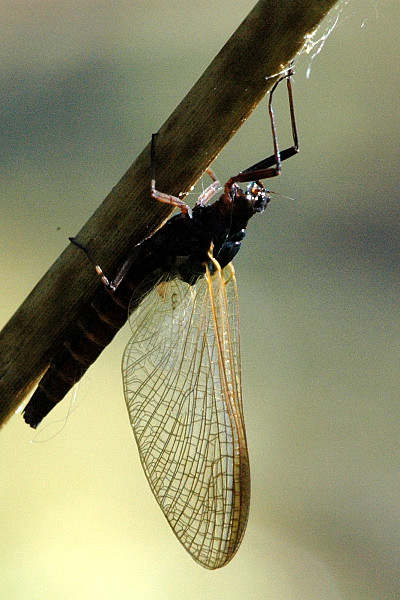
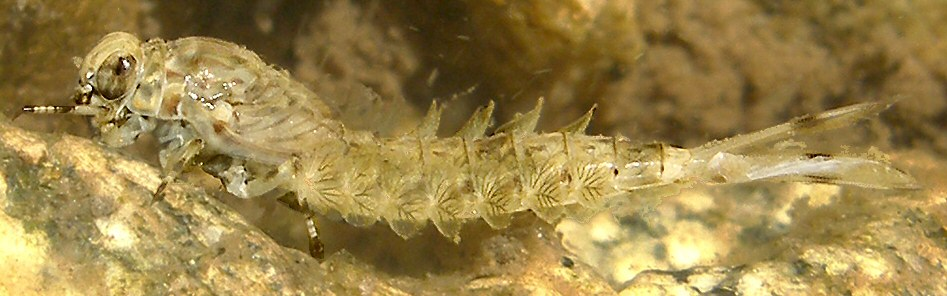
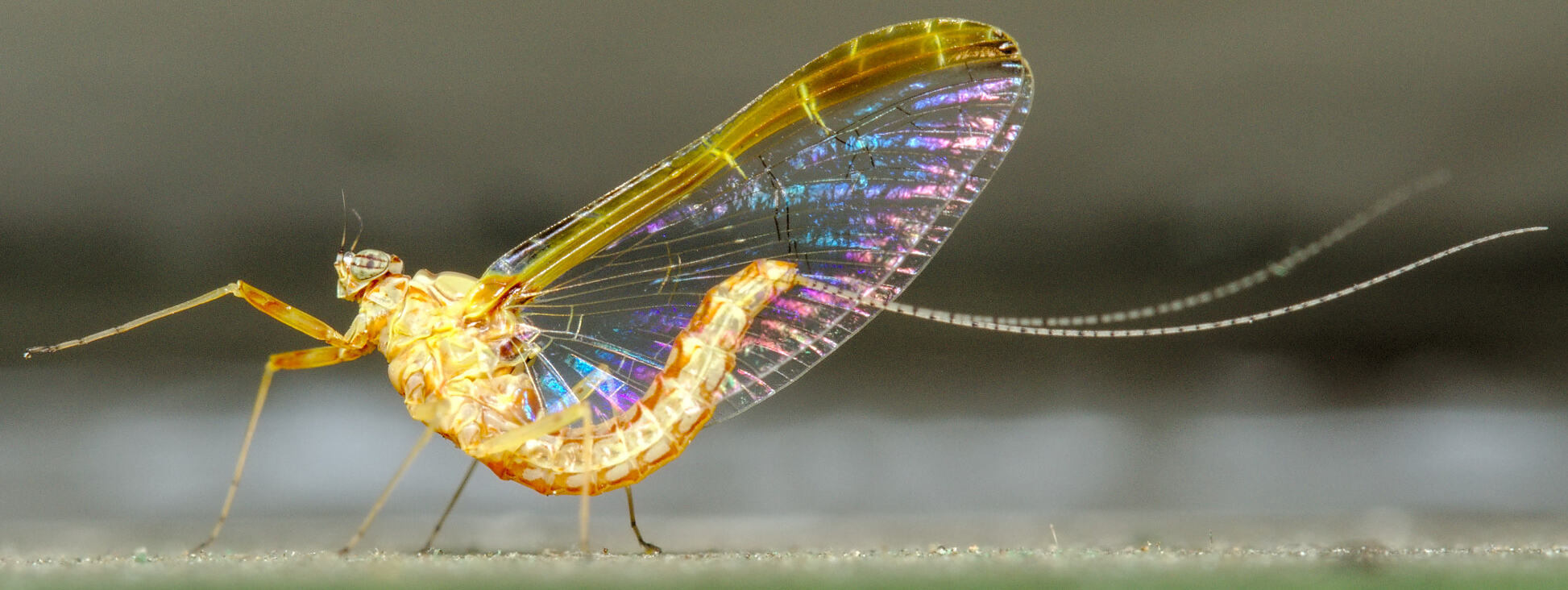
Top left: Mayfly nymph, dorsal view, showing the paired gills and three projections on the abdomen; wing buds are visible on the thorax. Top right: Subimago of Leptophlebia marginata. Middle: Nymph of the mayfly Cloeon dipterum, showing seven pairs of gills along the sides of the abdomen. Bottom: Lateral view of mayfly wing translucent iridescence.

Immature mayflies are aquatic and are referred to as nymphs or naiads. In contrast to their short lives as adults, they may live for several years in the water. They have an elongated, cylindrical or somewhat flattened body that passes through a number of instars (stages), moulting and increasing in size each time. When ready to emerge from the water, nymphs vary in length, depending on species, from 3 to 30 mm (0.12 to 1.18 in). The head has a tough outer covering of sclerotin, often with various hard ridges and projections; it points either forwards or downwards, with the mouth at the front. There are two large compound eyes, three ocelli (simple eyes) and a pair of antennae of variable lengths, set between or in front of the eyes. The mouthparts are designed for chewing and consist of a flap-like labrum, a pair of strong mandibles, a pair of maxillae, a membranous hypopharynx and a labium.

The thorax consists of three segments – the hindmost two, the mesothorax and metathorax, being fused. Each segment bears a pair of legs which usually terminate in a single claw. The legs are robust and often clad in bristles, hairs or spines. Wing pads develop on the mesothorax, and in some species, hindwing pads develop on the metathorax.

The abdomen consists of ten segments, some of which may be obscured by a large pair of operculate gills, a thoracic shield (expanded part of the prothorax) or the developing wing pads. In most taxa up to seven pairs of gills arise from the top or sides of the abdomen, but in some species they are under the abdomen, and in a very few species the gills are instead located on the coxae of the legs, or the bases of the maxillae. The abdomen terminates in slender thread-like projections, consisting of a pair of cerci, with or without a third central caudal filament.

=== Subimago ===
The final moult of the nymph is not to the full adult form, but to a winged stage called a subimago that physically resembles the adult, but which is usually sexually immature and duller in colour. The subimago, or dun, often has partially cloudy wings fringed with minute hairs known as microtrichia; its eyes, legs and genitalia are not fully developed. Females of some mayflies (subfamily Palingeniinae) do not moult from a subimago state into an adult stage and are sexually mature while appearing like a subimago with microtrichia on the wing membrane. Oligoneuriine mayflies form another exception in retaining microtrichia on their wings but not on their bodies. Subimagos are generally poor fliers, have shorter appendages, and typically lack the colour patterns used to attract mates. In males of Ephoron leukon, the subimagos have forelegs that are short and compressed, with accordion like folds, and expands to more than double its length after moulting. After a period, usually lasting one or two days but in some species only a few minutes, the subimago moults to the full adult form, making mayflies the only insects where a winged form undergoes a further moult.

=== Imago ===
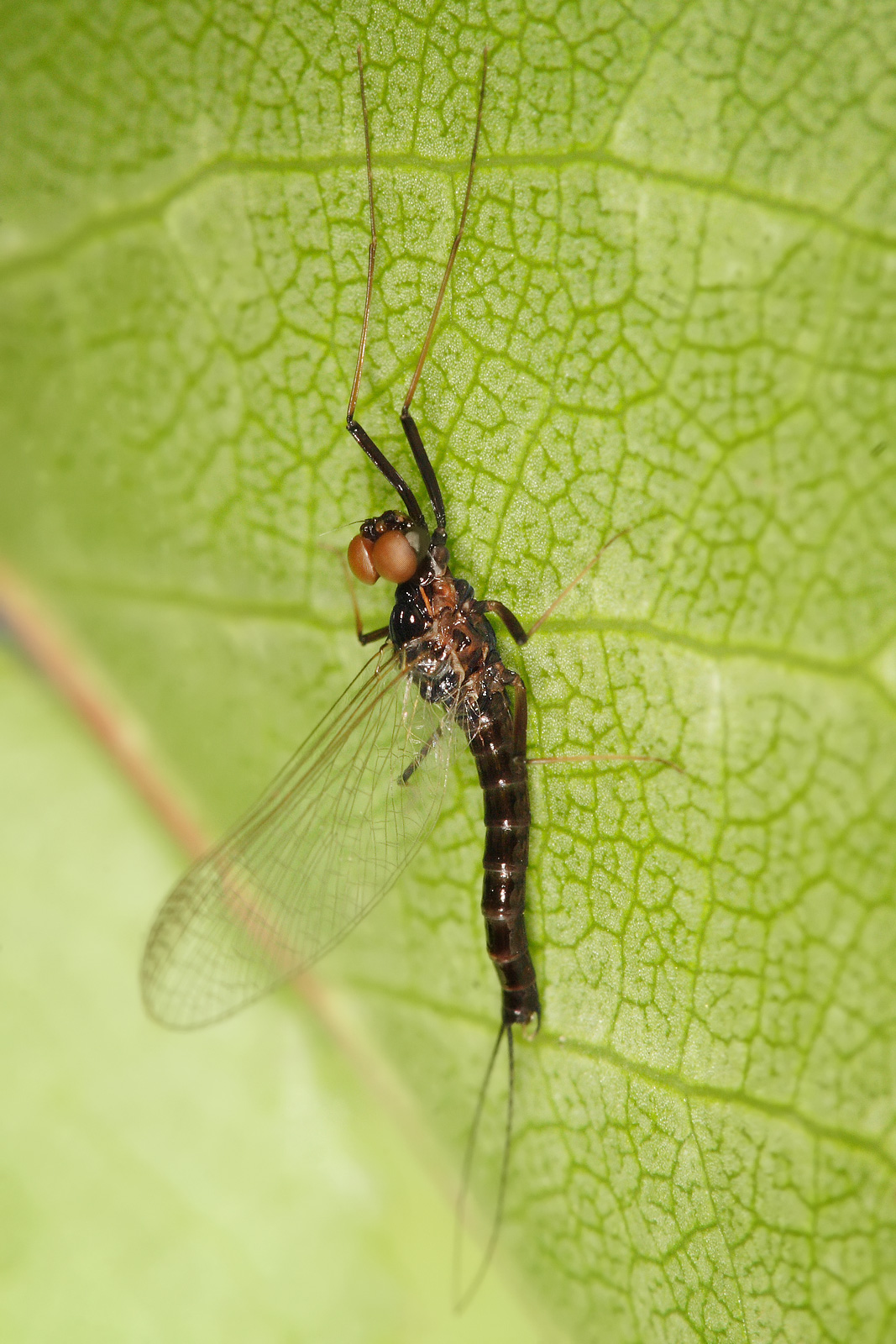
Adult Atalophlebia with the cylindrical dorsal or turban eyes visible

Adult mayflies, or imagos, are relatively primitive in structure, exhibiting traits that were probably present in the first flying insects. These include long tails and wings that do not fold flat over the abdomen. Mayflies are delicate-looking insects with one or two pairs of membranous, triangular wings, which are extensively covered with veins. At rest, the wings are held upright, like those of a butterfly. The hind wings are much smaller than the forewings and may be vestigial or absent. The second segment of the thorax, which bears the forewings, is enlarged to hold the main flight muscles. Adults have short, flexible antennae, large compound eyes, three ocelli and non-functional mouthparts. In most species, the males' eyes are large and the front legs unusually long, for use in locating and grasping females during the mid-air mating. In the males of some families, there are two large cylindrical "turban" eyes (also known as turbanate or turbinate eyes) that face upwards in addition to the lateral eyes that resemble those of females. The lateral eyes are apposition compound eyes but the turbinate eyes are thought by some to be superposition compound eyes while others suggest they may appear like superposition eyes but are based on more complex wave-guide like systems meant to detect ultraviolet light. They are thought to be used during courtship to detect females flying above them. In some species all the legs are functionless, apart from the front pair in males. The abdomen is long and roughly cylindrical, with ten segments and two or three long cerci (tail-like appendages) at the tip. Like Entognatha, Archaeognatha and Zygentoma, the spiracles on the abdomen do not have closing muscles. Uniquely among insects, mayflies possess paired genitalia, with the male having two aedeagi (penis-like organs) and the female two gonopores (sexual openings).

== Biology ==
=== Reproduction and life cycle ===
Mayflies are hemimetabolous (they have "incomplete metamorphosis"). They are unique among insects in that they moult one more time after acquiring functional wings; this last-but-one winged (alate) instar usually lives a very short time and is known as a subimago, or to fly fishermen as a dun. Mayflies at the subimago stage are a favourite food of many fish, and many fishing flies are modelled to resemble them. The subimago stage does not survive for long, rarely for more than 24 hours. In some species, it may last for just a few minutes, while the mayflies in the family Palingeniidae have sexually mature subimagos and no true adult form at all.

Often, all the individuals in a population mature at once (a hatch), and for a day or two in the spring or autumn, mayflies are extremely abundant, dancing around each other in large groups, or resting on every available surface. In many species the emergence is synchronised with dawn or dusk, and light intensity seems to be an important cue for emergence, but other factors may also be involved. Baetis intercalaris, for example, usually emerges just after sunset in July and August, but in one year, a large hatch was observed at midday in June. The soft-bodied subimagos are very attractive to predators. Synchronous emergence is probably an adaptive strategy that reduces the individual's risk of being eaten. The lifespan of an adult mayfly is very short, varying with the species. The primary function of the adult is reproduction; adults do not feed and have only vestigial mouthparts, while their digestive systems are filled with air. Dolania americana has the shortest adult lifespan of any mayfly: the adult females of the species live for less than five minutes.

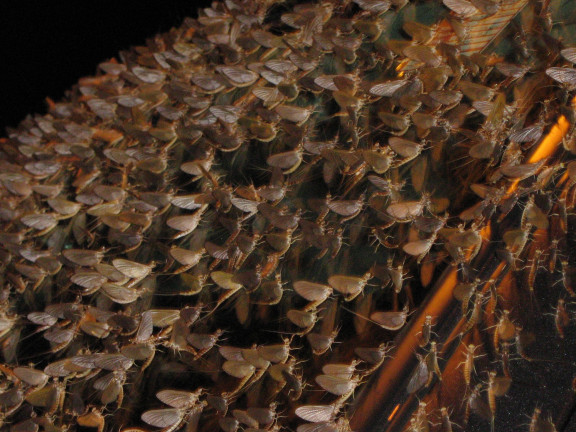
Mayflies (known locally as shadflies) swarm briefly in enormous numbers in Ontario.

Male adults may patrol individually, but most congregate in swarms a few metres above water with clear open sky above it, and perform a nuptial or courtship dance. Each insect has a characteristic up-and-down pattern of movement; strong wingbeats propel it upwards and forwards with the tail sloping down; when it stops moving its wings, it falls passively with the abdomen tilted upwards. Females fly into these swarms, and mating takes place in the air. A rising male clasps the thorax of a female from below using his front legs bent upwards, and inseminates her. Copulation may last just a few seconds, but occasionally a pair remains in tandem and flutters to the ground. Males may spend the night in vegetation and return to their dance the following day. Although they do not feed, some briefly touch the surface to drink a little water before flying off. The sperm transfer is direct as in Neoptera, contrasting with the indirect insemination of Odonata.

Females typically lay between four hundred and three thousand eggs. The eggs are often dropped onto the surface of the water; sometimes the female deposits them by dipping the tip of her abdomen into the water during flight, releasing a small batch of eggs each time, or deposits them in bulk while standing next to the water. In a few species, the female submerges and places the eggs among plants or in crevices underwater, but in general, they sink to the bottom. The incubation time is variable, depending at least in part on temperature, and may be anything from a few days to nearly a year. Eggs can go into a quiet dormant phase or diapause. The larval growth rate is also temperature-dependent, as is the number of moults. At anywhere between ten and fifty, these post-embryonic moults are more numerous in mayflies than in most other insect orders. The nymphal stage of mayflies may last from several months to several years, depending on species and environmental conditions.

Around half of all mayfly species whose reproductive biology has been described are parthenogenetic (able to asexually reproduce), including both partially and exclusively parthenogenetic populations and species.

Many species breed in moving water, where there is a tendency for the eggs and nymphs to get washed downstream. To counteract this, females may fly upriver before depositing their eggs. For example, the female Tisza mayfly, the largest European species with a length of 12 cm (4.7 in), flies up to 3 kilometres (2 mi) upstream before depositing eggs on the water surface. These sink to the bottom and hatch after 45 days, the nymphs burrowing their way into the sediment where they spend two or three years before hatching into subimagos.

When ready to emerge, several different strategies are used. In some species, the transformation of the nymph occurs underwater and the subimago swims to the surface and launches itself into the air. In other species, the nymph rises to the surface, bursts out of its skin, remains quiescent for a minute or two resting on the exuviae (cast skin) and then flies upwards, and in some, the nymph climbs out of the water before transforming.

=== Flight ===
Like the Odonata, mayflies lack the muscles and wing sclerites responsible for flexing the wings over the abdomen in Neoptera insects. However, they are similar to Neoptera in having indirect flight dorsoventral muscles, which move the wings only by deforming the thorax (by elevating and lowering the terga) instead of directly pulling them down as in Odonata. When not flying, mayflies point their wings in the same direction, as do damselflies.

=== Ecology ===
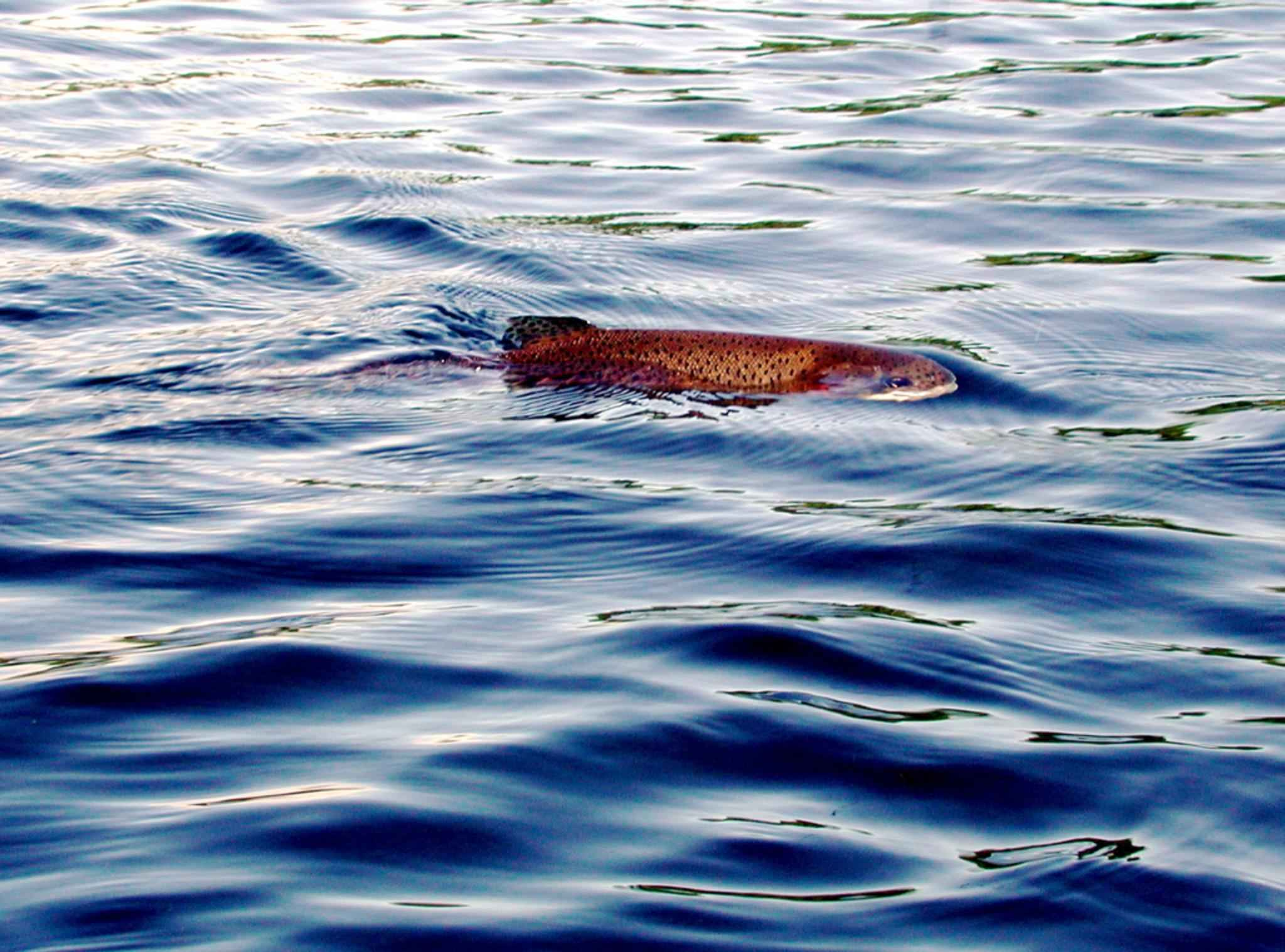
Rainbow trout are among the main predators of mayflies.

Nymphs live primarily in streams under rocks, in decaying vegetation or in sediments. Few species live in lakes, but they are among the most prolific. In the nymphs of most mayfly species, the paddle-like gills do not function as respiratory surfaces because sufficient oxygen is absorbed through the integument, instead serving to create a respiratory current. However, in low-oxygen environments such as the mud at the bottom of ponds in which Ephemera vulgata burrows, the filamentous gills act as true accessory respiratory organs and are used in gaseous exchange.

In most species, the nymphs are herbivores or detritivores, feeding on algae, diatoms or detritus, but in a few species, they are predators of chironomid and other small insect larvae and nymphs. Nymphs of Povilla burrow into submerged wood and can be a problem for boat owners in Africa and southeast Asia. Some are able to shift from one feeding group to another as they grow, thus enabling them to utilise a variety of food resources. They process a great quantity of organic matter as nymphs and transfer a lot of phosphates and nitrates to terrestrial environments when they emerge from the water, thus helping to remove pollutants from aqueous systems. Along with caddisfly larvae and gastropod molluscs, the grazing of mayfly nymphs has a significant impact on the primary producers, the plants and algae, on the bed of streams and rivers.

The nymphs are eaten by a wide range of predators and form an important part of the aquatic food chain. Fish are among the main predators, picking nymphs off the bottom or ingesting them in the water column, and feeding on emerging nymphs and adults on the water surface. Carnivorous stonefly, caddisfly, alderfly and dragonfly larvae feed on bottom-dwelling mayfly nymphs, as do aquatic beetles, leeches, crayfish and amphibians. Besides the direct mortality caused by these predators, the behaviour of their potential prey is also affected, with the nymphs' growth rate being slowed by the need to hide rather than feed. The nymphs are highly susceptible to pollution and can be useful in the biomonitoring of water bodies. Once they have emerged, large numbers are preyed on by birds, bats and by other insects, such as Rhamphomyia longicauda.

Mayfly nymphs may serve as hosts for parasites such as nematodes and trematodes. Some of these affect the nymphs' behaviour in such a way that they become more likely to be predated. Other nematodes turn adult male mayflies into quasi-females which haunt the edges of streams, enabling the parasites to break their way out into the aqueous environment they need to complete their life cycles. The nymphs can also serve as intermediate hosts for the horsehair worm Paragordius varius, which causes its definitive host, a grasshopper, to jump into water and drown.

Mayflies are involved in both primary production and bioturbation. A study in laboratory simulated streams revealed that the mayfly genus Centroptilum increased the export of periphyton, thus indirectly affecting primary production positively, which is an essential process for ecosystems. The mayfly can also reallocate and alter the nutrient availability in aquatic habitats through the process of bioturbation. By burrowing in the bottom of lakes and redistributing nutrients, mayflies indirectly regulate phytoplankton and epibenthic primary production. Once burrowing to the bottom of the lake, mayfly nymphs begin to billow their respiratory gills. This motion creates current that carries food particles through the burrow and allows the nymph to filter feed. Other mayfly nymphs possess elaborate filter feeding mechanisms like that of the genus Isonychia. The nymph have forelegs that contain long bristle-like structures that have two rows of hairs. Interlocking hairs form the filter by which the insect traps food particles. The action of filter feeding has a small impact on water purification but an even larger impact on the convergence of small particulate matter into matter of a more complex form that goes on to benefit consumers later in the food chain.

=== Distribution ===
Mayflies are distributed all over the world in clean freshwater habitats, though absent from Antarctica. They tend to be absent from oceanic islands or represented by one or two species that have dispersed from nearby mainland. Female mayflies may be dispersed by wind, and eggs may be transferred by adhesion to the legs of waterbirds. The greatest generic diversity is found in the Neotropical realm, while the Holarctic has a smaller number of genera but a high degree of speciation. Some thirteen families are restricted to a single bioregion. The main families have some general habitat preferences: the Baetidae favour warm water; the Heptageniidae live under stones and prefer fast-flowing water; and the relatively large Ephemeridae make burrows in sandy lake or river beds.

== Conservation ==
The nymph is the dominant life history stage of the mayfly. Different insect species vary in their tolerance to water pollution, but in general, the larval stages of mayflies, stoneflies (Plecoptera) and caddis flies (Trichoptera) are susceptible to a number of pollutants including sewage, pesticides and industrial effluent. In general, mayflies are particularly sensitive to acidification, but tolerances vary, and certain species are exceptionally tolerant to heavy metal contamination and to low pH levels. Ephemerellidae are among the most tolerant groups and Siphlonuridae and Caenidae the least. The adverse effects on the insects of pollution may be either lethal or sub-lethal, in the latter case resulting in altered enzyme function, poor growth, changed behaviour or lack of reproductive success. As important parts of the food chain, pollution can cause knock-on effects to other organisms; a dearth of herbivorous nymphs can cause overgrowth of algae, and a scarcity of predacious nymphs can result in an over-abundance of their prey species. Fish that feed on mayfly nymphs that have bioaccumulated heavy metals are themselves at risk. Adult female mayflies find water by detecting the polarization of reflected light. They are easily fooled by other polished surfaces which can act as traps for swarming mayflies.

The threat to mayflies applies also to their eggs. "Modest levels" of pollution in rivers in England are sufficient to kill 80% of mayfly eggs, which are as vulnerable to pollutants as other life-cycle stages; numbers of the blue-winged olive mayfly (Baetis) have fallen dramatically, almost to none in some rivers. The major pollutants thought to be responsible are fine sediment and phosphate from agriculture and sewage.

The status of many species of mayflies is unknown because they are known from only the original collection data. Four North American species are believed to be extinct. Among these, Pentagenia robusta was originally collected from the Ohio River near Cincinnati, but this species has not been seen since its original collection in the 1800s. Ephemera compar is known from a single specimen, collected from the "foothills of Colorado" in 1873, but despite intensive surveys of the Colorado mayflies reported in 1984, it has not been rediscovered.

The International Union for Conservation of Nature (IUCN) red list of threatened species includes one mayfly: Tasmanophlebia lacuscoerulei, the large blue lake mayfly, which is a native of Australia and is listed as endangered because its alpine habitat is vulnerable to climate change.

== Taxonomy and phylogeny ==
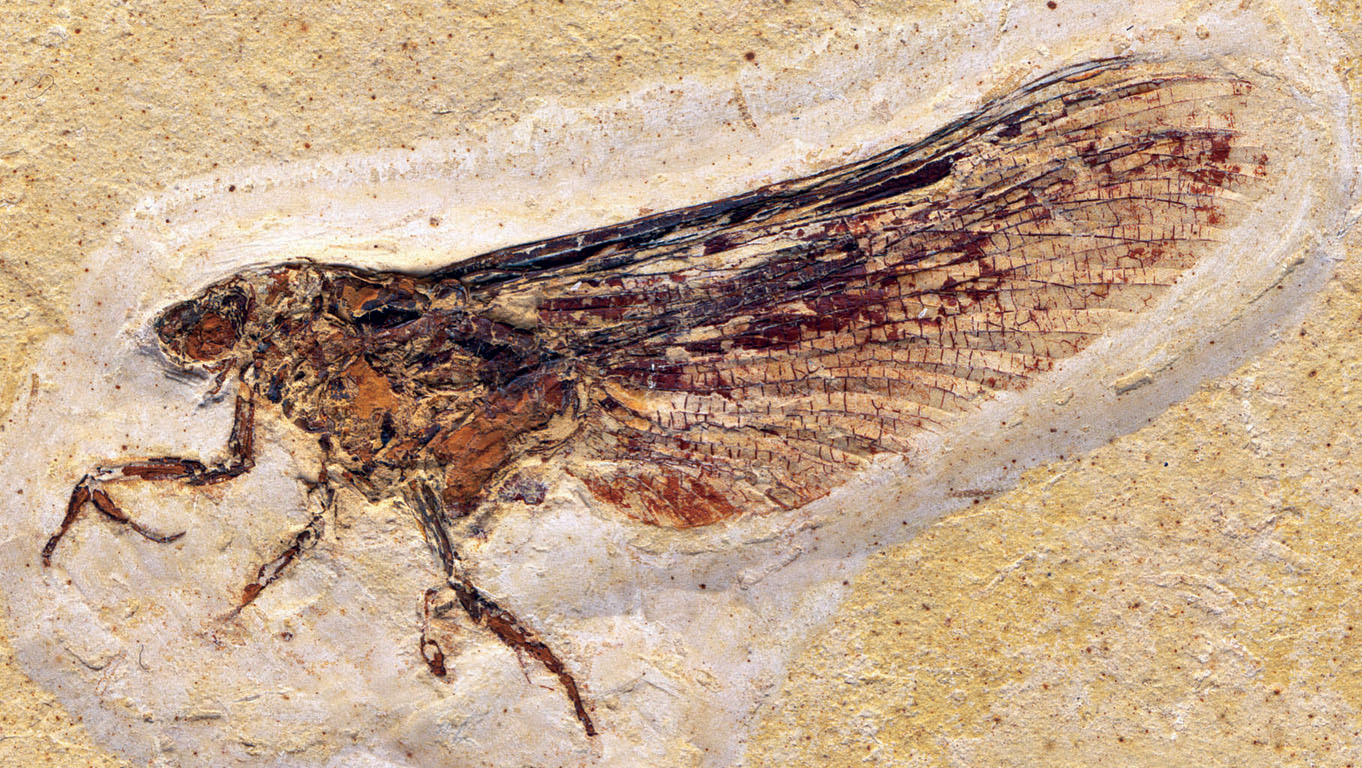
Fossil adult Mickoleitia longimanus (Coxoplectoptera: Mickoleitiidae) from the Lower Cretaceous Crato Formation of Brazil, c. 108 mya

Ephemeroptera was defined by Alpheus Hyatt and Jennie Maria Arms Sheldon in 1890–91. The taxonomy of the Ephemeroptera was reworked by George F. Edmunds and Jay R Traver, starting in 1954. Traver contributed to the 1935 work The Biology of Mayflies, and has been called "the first Ephemeroptera specialist in North America".

As of 2012, over 3,000 species of mayfly in 42 families and over 400 genera are known worldwide, including about 630 species in North America. Mayflies are an ancient group of winged (pterygote) insects. Putative fossil stem group representatives (e.g. Syntonopteroidea-like Lithoneura lameerrei) are already known from the late Carboniferous. The name Ephemeroptera is from the Greek ἐφήμερος, ephemeros, "short-lived" (literally "lasting a day", cf. English "ephemeral"), and πτερόν, pteron, "wing", referring to the brief lifespan of adults. The English common name is for the insect's emergence in or around the month of May in the UK. The name shadfly is from the Atlantic fish the shad, which runs up American East Coast rivers at the same time as many mayflies emerge.

From the Permian, numerous stem group representatives of mayflies are known, which are often lumped into a separate taxon Permoplectoptera (e.g. including Protereisma permianum in the Protereismatidae, and Misthodotidae). The larvae of Permoplectoptera still had nine pairs of abdominal gills, and the adults still had long hindwings. Maybe the fossil family Cretereismatidae from the Lower Cretaceous Crato Formation of Brazil also belongs as the last offshoot to Permoplectoptera. The Crato outcrops otherwise yielded fossil specimens of modern mayfly families or the extinct (but modern) family Hexagenitidae. However, from the same locality the strange larvae and adults of the extinct family Mickoleitiidae (order Coxoplectoptera) have been described, which represents the fossil sister group of modern mayflies, even though they had very peculiar adaptations such as raptorial forelegs.

The oldest mayfly inclusion in amber is Cretoneta zherichini (Leptophlebiidae) from the Lower Cretaceous of Siberia. In the much younger Baltic amber numerous inclusions of several modern families of mayflies have been found (Ephemeridae, Potamanthidae, Leptophlebiidae, Ametropodidae, Siphlonuridae, Isonychiidae, Heptageniidae, and Ephemerellidae). The modern genus Neoephemera is represented in the fossil record by the Ypresian species N. antiqua from Washington state.

Grimaldi and Engel, reviewing the phylogeny in 2005, commented that many cladistic studies had been made with no stability in Ephemeroptera suborders and infraorders; the traditional division into Schistonota and Pannota was wrong because Pannota is derived from the Schistonota. The phylogeny of the Ephemeroptera was first studied using molecular analysis by Ogden and Whiting in 2005. They recovered the Baetidae as sister to the other clades. Mayfly phylogeny was further studied using morphological and molecular analyses by Ogden and others in 2009. They found that the Asian genus Siphluriscus was sister to all other mayflies. Some existing lineages such as Ephemeroidea, and families such as Ameletopsidae, were found not to be monophyletic, through convergence among nymphal features.

The following traditional classification, with two suborders Pannota and Schistonota, was introduced in 1979 by W. P. McCafferty and George F. Edmunds. The list is based on Peters and Campbell (1991), in Insects of Australia.

Suborder Pannota

- Superfamily Ephemerelloidea
  - Ephemerellidae
  - Leptohyphidae
  - Tricorythidae
- Superfamily Caenoidea
  - Neoephemeridae
  - Baetiscidae
  - Caenidae
  - Prosopistomatidae

Suborder Schistonota

- Superfamily Baetoidea
  - Siphlonuridae
  - Baetidae
  - Oniscigastridae
  - Ameletopsidae
  - Ametropodidae
- Superfamily Heptagenioidea
  - Coloburiscidae
  - Oligoneuriidae
  - Isonychiidae
  - Heptageniidae
- Superfamily Leptophlebioidea
  - Leptophlebiidae
- Superfamily Ephemeroidea
  - Behningiidae
  - Potamanthidae
  - Euthyplociidae
  - Polymitarcyidae
  - Ephemeridae
  - Palingeniidae

=== Phylogeny ===
After Liegeois et al. 2021:

- - Siphluriscidae
  - - Baetidae
    - - Carapacea
        - Baetiscidae
        - Prosopistomatidae
      - - - Coloburiscidae
          - - Leptophlebiidae
            - - - Chromarcyidae
                - Oligoneuriidae
              - - Ephemerelloidea
                  - Vietnamellidae
                  - - Austremerellidae
                    - - - Teloganodidae
                        - - - Teloganellidae
                            - Melanemerellidae
                          - - Ephemerythidae
                            - - Machadorythidae
                              - - - Tricorythidae
                                  - Dicercomyzidae
                                - - Coryphoridae
                                  - Leptohyphidae
                      - Ephemerellidae
                - Caenoidea
                  - Neoephemeridae
                  - Caenidae
                - - Potamanthidae
                  - - Polymitarcyidae
                    - - - Behningiidae
                        - Euthyplociidae
                      - - Ichthybotidae
                        - - Palingeniidae
                          - Ephemeridae
        - - - Acanthametropodidae
            - Ametropodidae
          - Metropodidae
          - - Isonychiidae
            - Heptageniidae
          - - - - Rallidentidae
                - Siphlaenigmatidae
                - Dipteromimidae
                - Oniscigastridae
              - Ameletopsidae
            - - Nesameletidae
              - - Ameletidae
                - Siphlonuridae

== In human culture ==
=== In art ===
Mayflies have appeared in fine art in both the fifteenth and the seventeenth centuries. In 1495 Albrecht Dürer included a mayfly in his engraving The Holy Family with the Mayfly. The critics Larry Silver and Pamela H. Smith argue that the image provides "an explicit link between heaven and earth ... to suggest a cosmic resonance between sacred and profane, celestial and terrestrial, macrocosm and microcosm." The Dutch Golden Age author Augerius Clutius (Outgert Cluyt) illustrated some mayflies in his 1634 De Hemerobio ("On the Mayfly"), the earliest book written on the group. Maerten de Vos similarly illustrated a mayfly in his 1587 depiction of the fifth day of creation. In Szeged, Hungary, mayflies are celebrated in a monument near the Belvárosi bridge, the work of local sculptor Pal Farkas.

Mayflies in art

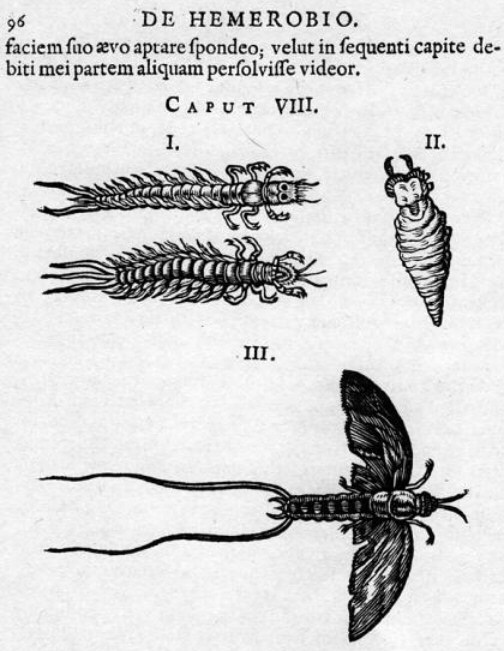
Mayflies drawn by Augerius Clutius (Note: Clutius is the latinised form of Outgert Cluyt (1578–1636).) in De Hemerobio, 1634

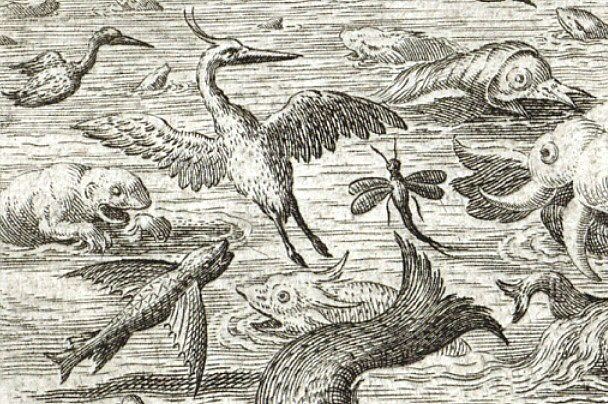
Mayfly by Jan Sadeler after Maerten de Vos, detail from The Fifth Day: The Creation of the Birds and Fishes, c. 1587

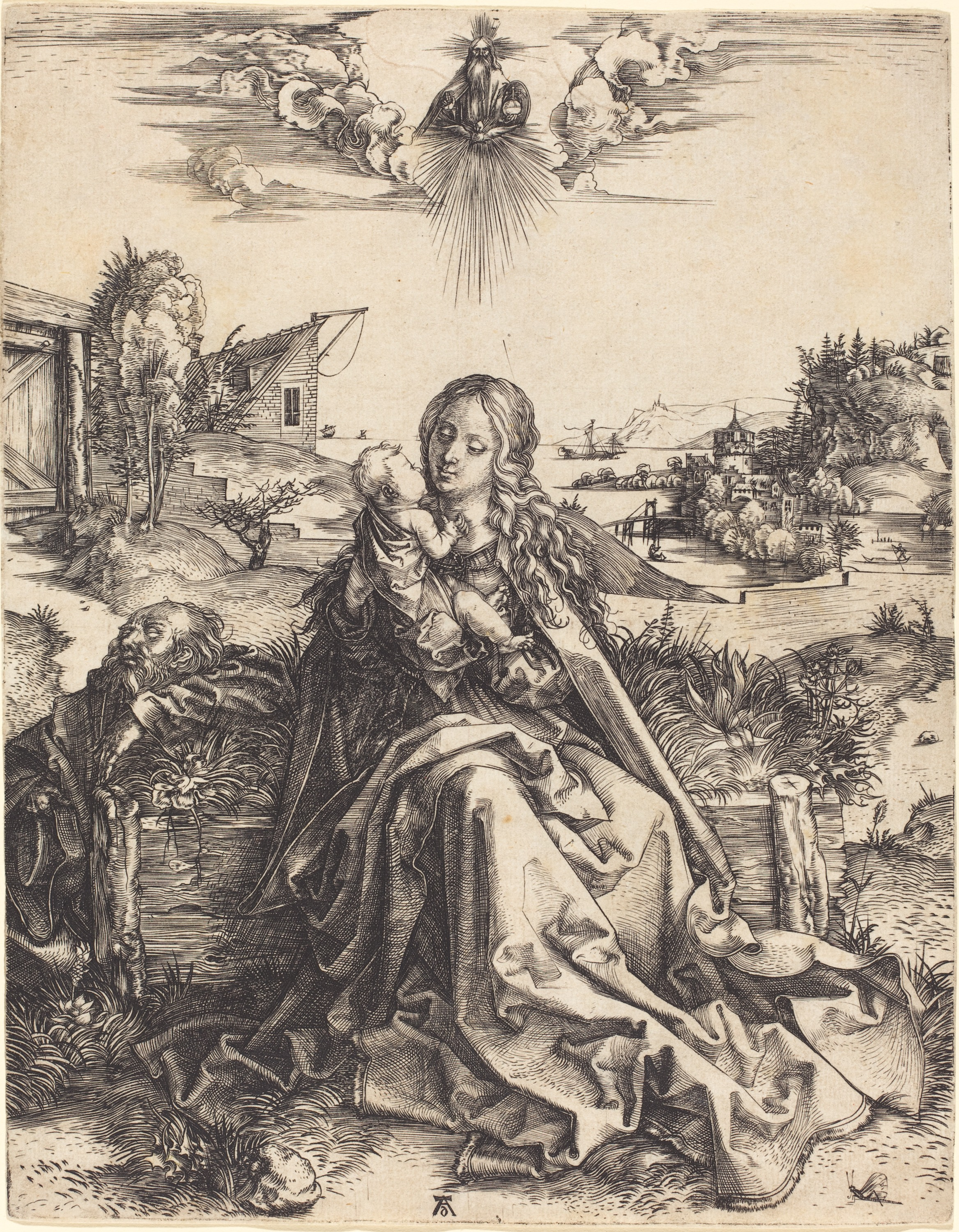
Albrecht Dürer's engraving The Holy Family with the Mayfly, 1495

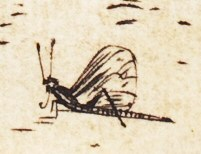
Detail of "mayfly" in lower right corner of Albrecht Dürer's engraving The Holy Family with the Mayfly, 1495

=== In natural history ===
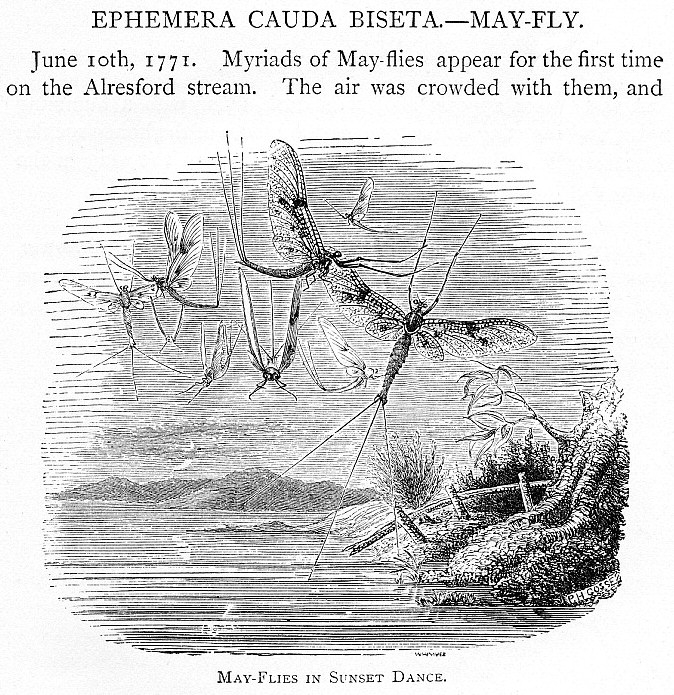
"May-Flies in Sunset Dance" by Philip Henry Gosse in a Victorian edition of Gilbert White's Natural History of Selborne

The mayfly has attracted the attention of natural historians since Aristotle. He noted in his History of Animals that the mayfly is unusual in moving with four legs. It actually has three pairs of legs, but the front pair are used as claspers to hold the female during the mating flight The Ancient Roman encyclopaedist Pliny the Elder described the mayfly in his Natural History, noting that the adult emerges from a "four-legged caterpillar ... but it does not live beyond one day, owing to which it is called the hemerobius." In his 1789 The Natural History and Antiquities of Selborne, the English parson-naturalist Gilbert White described in the entry for "June 10th, 1771" how "Myriads of May-flies appear for the first time on the Alresford stream", and the trout ate them before their wings hardened. He noted that "their motions are very peculiar, up and down for so many yards almost in a perpendicular line." The hatch of the giant mayfly Palingenia longicauda on the Tisza and Maros Rivers in Hungary and Serbia, known as "Tisza blooming", has become a tourist attraction. In some years, such as 1958 and 2014, the hatch of Hexagenia bilineata in the Upper Mississippi Valley is in vast numbers, attracting notice as a nuisance on roads.

=== Brevity of life ===
The mayfly has come to symbolise the transitoriness of life. Peter Marren notes that the best-known thing about mayflies is their one-day adult life: he quotes from the poem "Adonais" by Percy Bysshe Shelley, "each ephemeral insect then / Is gather'd into death without a dawn", and remarks, "no wonder mayfly is a byword for brevity". The Epic of Gilgamesh, one of the earliest works of literature, likens the brevity of Gilgamesh's life to that of the adult mayfly: in Tablet X, Utanapishtim says to Gilgamesh that "Ever the river has risen and brought us the flood, the mayfly floating on the water. On the face of the sun its countenance gazes, then all of a sudden nothing is there!" The Roman lawyer Cicero wrote philosophically of them in his Tusculan Disputations, noting Aristotle's remark that the mayfly's life is just one day, and that compared to eternity, human life too is almost as brief. Scholars have noted that the English poet George Crabbe wrote a poem that compares the brief life of a newspaper with that of mayflies, both being known as "Ephemera", things that live for a day.

=== As a name for ships and aircraft ===
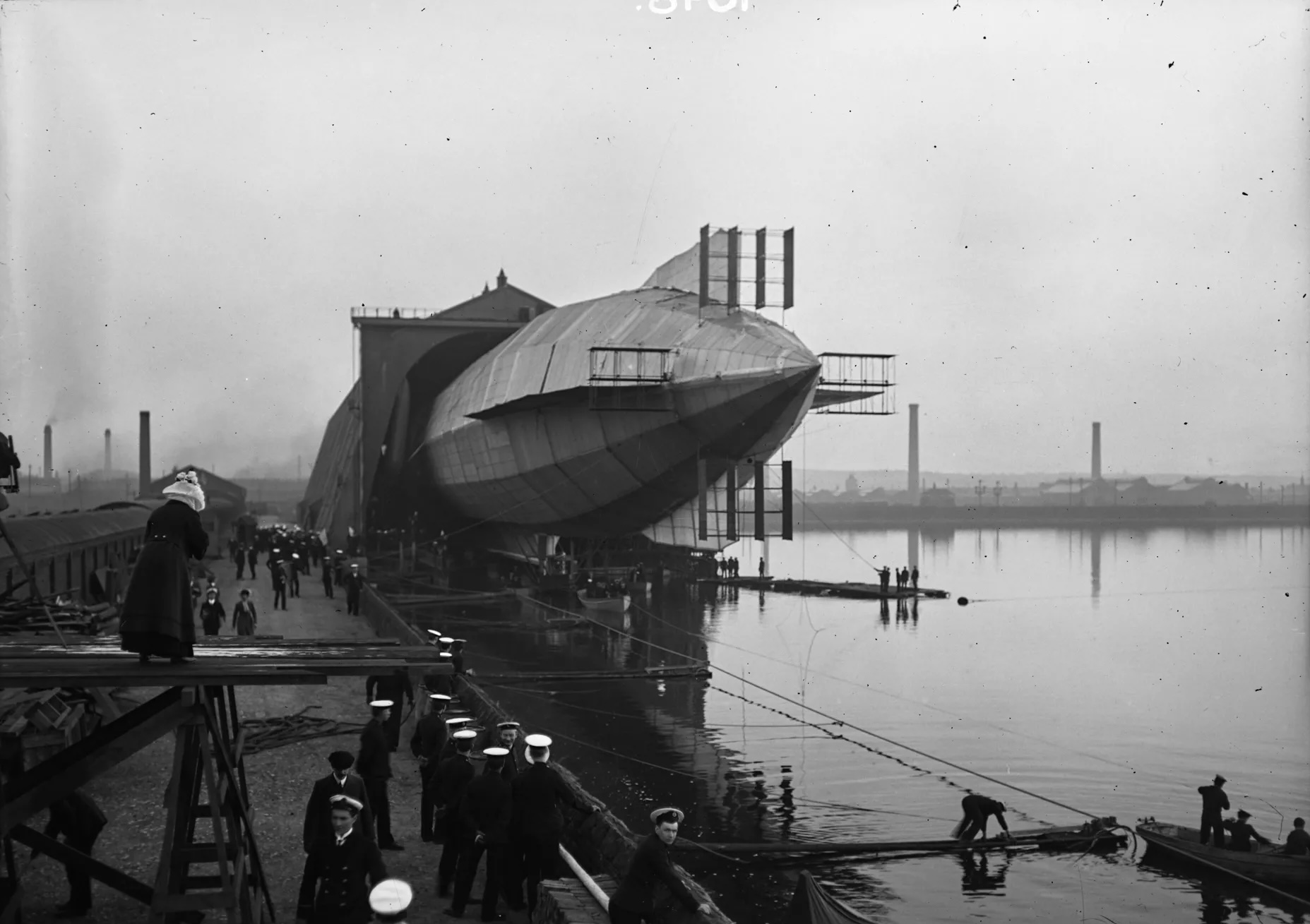
HMA No. 1 Mayfly emerging from her floating shed at Vickers' yard at Barrow-in-Furness on 24 September 1911

Several ships and aircraft have been named after the mayfly. "Mayfly" was the crew's nickname for His Majesty's Airship No. 1, an aerial scout airship wrecked by strong winds in 1911 before her trial flights. Two vessels of the Royal Navy were named HMS Mayfly: a torpedo boat launched in January 1907, and a Fly-class river gunboat constructed in sections at Yarrow in 1915. Among early heavier than air flying machines, the Seddon Mayfly, constructed in 1908, was an unsuccessful design, while the first aircraft designed by a woman, Lillian Bland, was titled the Bland Mayfly.

== Practical uses ==
=== In fly fishing ===
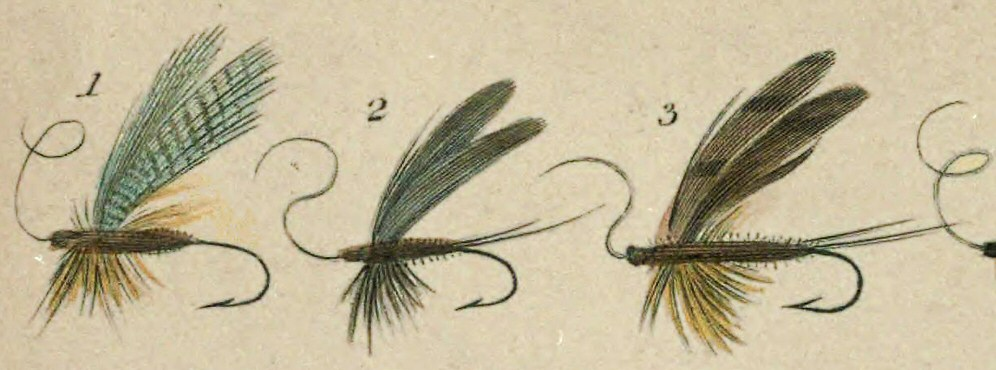
Fishing flies from Charles and Richard Bowlker's Art of Angling (1854) 2. "Blue Dun" mayfly. 3. "March Brown" mayfly

Mayflies are the primary source of models for artificial flies, hooks tied with coloured materials such as threads and feathers, used in fly fishing. These are based on different life-cycle stages of mayflies. For example, the flies known as "emergers" in North America are designed by fly fishermen to resemble subimago mayflies, and are intended to lure freshwater trout. In 1983, Patrick McCafferty recorded that artificial flies had been based on 36 genera of North American mayfly, from a total of 63 western species and 103 eastern/central species. A large number of these species have common names among fly fishermen, who need to develop a substantial knowledge of mayfly "habitat, distribution, seasonality, morphology and behavior" in order to match precisely the look and movements of the insects that the local trout are expecting.

Izaak Walton describes the use of mayflies for catching trout in his 1653 book The Compleat Angler; for example, he names the "Green-drake" for use as a natural fly, and "duns" (mayfly subimagos) as artificial flies. These include for example the "Great Dun" and the "Great Blue Dun" in February; the "Whitish Dun" in March; the "Whirling Dun" and the "Yellow Dun" in April; the "Green-drake", the "Little Yellow May-Fly" and the "Grey-Drake" in May; and the "Black-Blue Dun" in July. Nymph or "wet fly" fishing was restored to popularity on the chalk streams of England by G. E. M. Skues with his 1910 book Minor Tactics of the Chalk Stream. In the book, Skues discusses the use of duns to catch trout. The March brown is "probably the most famous of all British mayflies", having been copied by anglers to catch trout for over 500 years. Some English public houses beside trout streams such as the River Test in Hampshire are named "The Mayfly".

=== Other uses ===
Mayflies are eaten in several cultures and are estimated to contain the most raw protein content of any edible insect by dry weight. In Malawi, kungu, a paste of mayflies (Caenis kungu) and mosquitoes is made into a cake for eating. Adult mayflies are collected and eaten in many parts of China and Japan. Near Lake Victoria, Povilla mayflies are collected, dried and preserved for use in food preparations.

In pre-1950s France, chute de manne was obtained by pressing mayflies into cakes and using them as bird food and fishbait. From an economic standpoint, mayflies provide fisheries with an excellent diet for fish.

Research on genome expression in the mayfly Cloeon dipterum, has provided ideas on the evolution of the insect wing and giving support to the so-called gill theory which suggests that the ancestral insect wing may have evolved from larval gills of aquatic insects like mayflies. Mayfly larvae do not survive in polluted aquatic habitats and, thus, have been chosen as bioindicators, markers of water quality in ecological assessments.
