= List of Ephemeropterans of Sri Lanka =

Sri Lanka is a tropical island situated close to the southern tip of India. The invertebrate fauna is as large as it is common to other regions of the world. There are about 2 million species of arthropods found in the world, and still it is counting. So many new species are discover up to this time also. So it is very complicated and difficult to summarize the exact number of species found within a certain region.

This is a list of the ephemeropterans found from Sri Lanka.

== Mayfly ==
Phylum: Arthropoda
Class: Insecta
Order: Ephemeroptera

Mayflies or shadflies are aquatic insects belonging to the order Ephemeroptera. Over 3,000 species of mayfly are known worldwide, grouped into over 400 genera in 42 families.

Mayflies are relatively primitive insects and exhibit a number of ancestral traits that were probably present in the first flying insects, such as long tails and wings that do not fold flat over the abdomen. They are aquatic insects whose immature stages (called "naiads" or "nymphs") live in fresh water, where their presence indicates a clean, unpolluted environment. They are unique among insect orders in having a fully winged terrestrial adult stage, the subimago, which moults into a sexually mature adult, the imago.

In 1853, Walker first described about two species of mayflies from Sri Lanka. Then 1858, Hagen documented 8 more species from the country. The most useful taxonomic and other ecological aspects of mayflies of Sri Lanka came during 1960s and 1970s by Peters (1967) and Peters & Edmunds (1970). In 1965, Fernando described comprehensive work on mayflies. Through this, Hubbard and co-workers documented 46 species in 8 families from the country which is the most valuable source for present day as well. Currently there are 52 species of mayflies are reported from Sri Lanka, which belongs to 8 families.

=== Family: Baetidae ===
- Acentrella feminalis (Eaton, 1885)
- Baetis acceptus Muller-Liebenau & Hubbard 1985
- Baetis collinus Muller-Liebenau & Hubbard, 1985
- Baetis conservatus Muller-Liebenau & Hubbard, 1985
- Baetis consuetus Hagen, 1853
- Baetis frequentus Muller-Liebenau & Hubbard, 1985
- Baetis pseudofrequentus Muller-Liebenau & Hubbard, 1985
- Baetis solidus (Hagen, 1858)
- Centroptella soldani Muller-Liebenau 1983
- Chopralla ceylonensis (Muller-Liebenau 1983)
- Chopralla similis (Muller-Liebenau 1983)
- Cloeon marginale (Hagen, 1858)
- Indobaetis costai Muller-Liebenau & Morihara, 1982
- Indobaetis starmuehlneri Muller-Liebenau, 1982
- Indocloeon primum Muller-Liebenau, 1982
- Indocloeon secundum Kluge & Suttinun, 2020
- Labiobaetis geminatus (Muller-Liebenau & Hubbard, 1985)
- Labiobaetis ordinatum (Muller-Liebenau & Hubbard 1985)
- Labiobaetis pulchellum (Muller-Liebenau & Hubbard 1985)
- Liebebiella ambigua (Muller-Liebenau, 1982)
- Liebebiella vera (Muller-Liebenau, 1982) [=Liebebiella difficila (Muller-Liebenau, 1982)]
- Liebebiella klapaleki (Muller-Liebenau, 1982)
- Liebebiella orientale (Muller-Liebenau, 1982)
- Procloeon bimaculatum (Eaton, 1885)
- Procloeon regularum Muller-Liebenau & Hubbard, 1985
- Pseudocentroptiloides ceylonica Glazaczow, 1987

=== Family: Caenidae ===
- Caenis perpusilla Walker, 1853
- Clypeocaenis femorisetosa
- Sparbarus gilliesi

=== Family: Ephemerellidae ===
- Teloganodes hubbardi Sartori, 2008
- Teloganodes insignis (Wang & McCafferty, 1996)
- Teloganodes jacobusi Sartori, 2008
- Teloganodes major Eaton, 1884
- Teloganodes tristis (Hagen, 1858)
- Teloganodes tuberculatus Sartori, 2008

=== Family: Ephemeridae ===
- Ephemera hasakalensis Hubbard, 1983
- Ephemera lankensis Hubbard, 1983
- Ephemera nathani Hubbard, 1982
- Ephemera supposita Eaton, 1883
- Ephoron indicus (Pictet, 1843)
- Povilla taprobanes Hubbard, 1984
- Rhoenanthus posticus Banks, 1914

=== Family: Leptophlebiidae ===
- Choroterpes signata (Hagen, 1858)
- Isca serendiba Peters & Edmunds, 1970
- Kimminsula annulata (Hagen, 1858)
- Kimminsula fasciata (Hagen, 1858)
- Kimminsula femoralis (Hagen, 1858)
- Kimminsula taprobanes (Walker, 1853)
- Megaglena brincki Peters & Edmunds, 1970

=== Family: Polymitarcyidae ===
- Ephoron indica
- Povilla taprobanes

=== Family: Prosopistomatidae ===
- Prosopistoma lieftincki Peters, 1967

=== Family: Teloganodidae ===
- Indoganodes tschertoprudi Martynov & Palatov, 2020

=== Family: Tricorythidae ===
- Sparsorythus jacobsoni (Ulmer, 1913)
