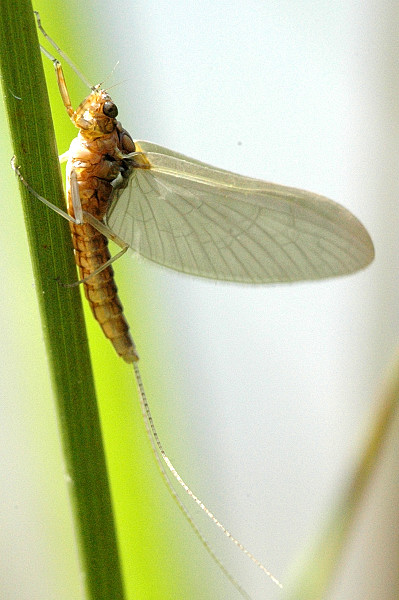
- Caenis horaria

Scientific classification
- Domain: Eukaryota
- Kingdom: Animalia
- Phylum: Arthropoda
- Class: Insecta
- Order: Ephemeroptera
- Suborder: Pannota
- Superfamily: Caenoidea

= Caenoidea =

Superfamily of mayflies

Caenoidea is a superfamily of mayflies in the suborder Pannota. Members of this superfamily can be distinguished from those of Ephemerelloidea by the fact that the gills of the nymphs are filamentous.

The following families are recognised:

- Baetiscidae
- Caenidae
- Neoephemeridae
- Prosopistomatidae
