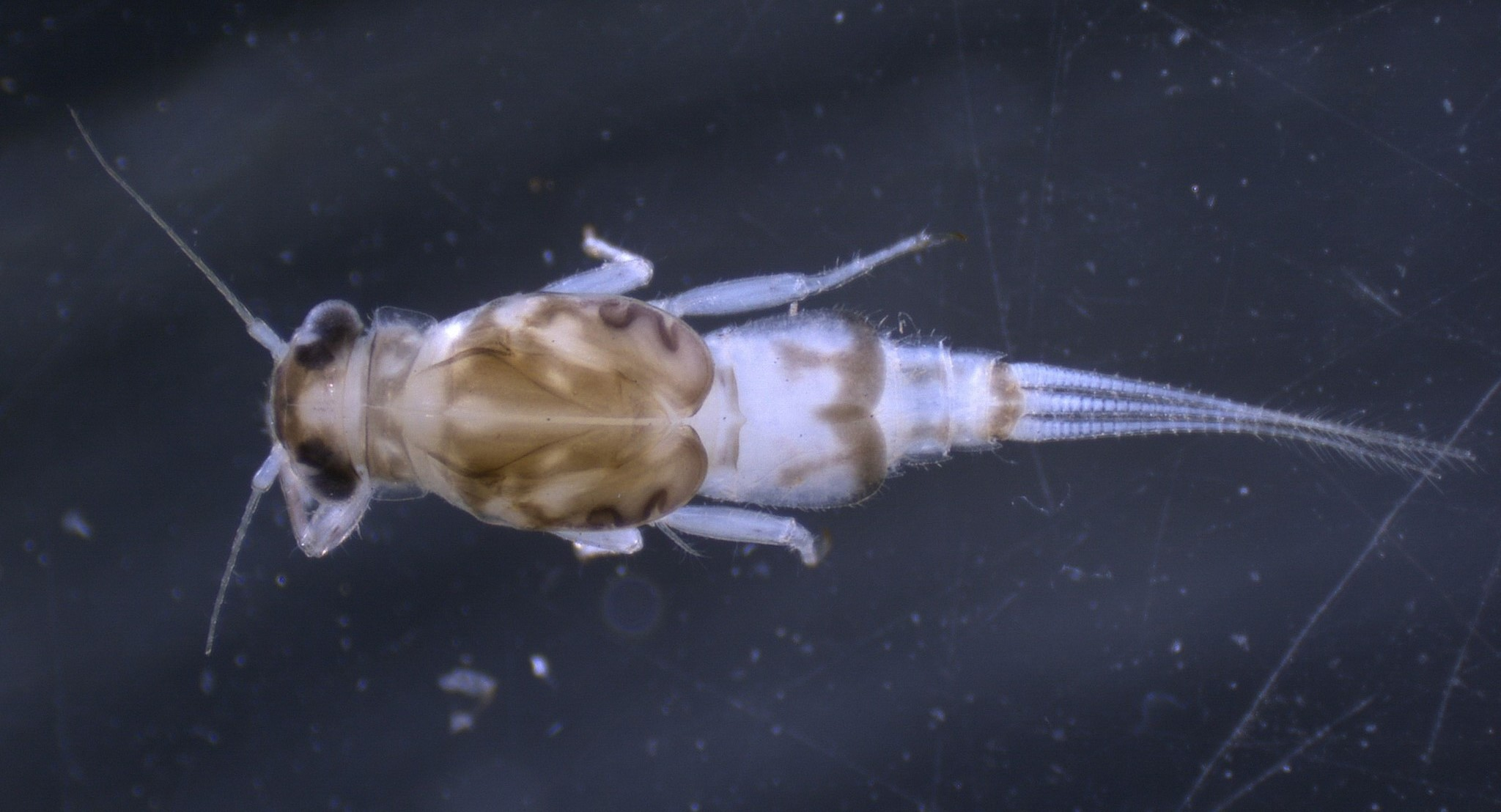

Scientific classification
- Kingdom: Animalia
- Phylum: Arthropoda
- Clade: Pancrustacea
- Class: Insecta
- Order: Ephemeroptera
- Family: Caenidae
- Genus: Caenis
- Species: C. hilaris

Binomial name
- Caenis hilaris (Say, 1839)

= Caenis hilaris =

Species of mayfly

Caenis hilaris is a species of small squaregilled mayfly in the family Caenidae. It is found in North America.
