= Caenis anceps =

Scientific classification
- Domain: Eukaryota
- Kingdom: Animalia
- Phylum: Arthropoda
- Class: Insecta
- Order: Ephemeroptera
- Family: Caenidae
- Genus: Caenis
- Species: C. anceps

Binomial name
- Caenis anceps Traver, 1935

Species of mayfly

Caenis anceps is a species of mayfly in the genus Caenis.
