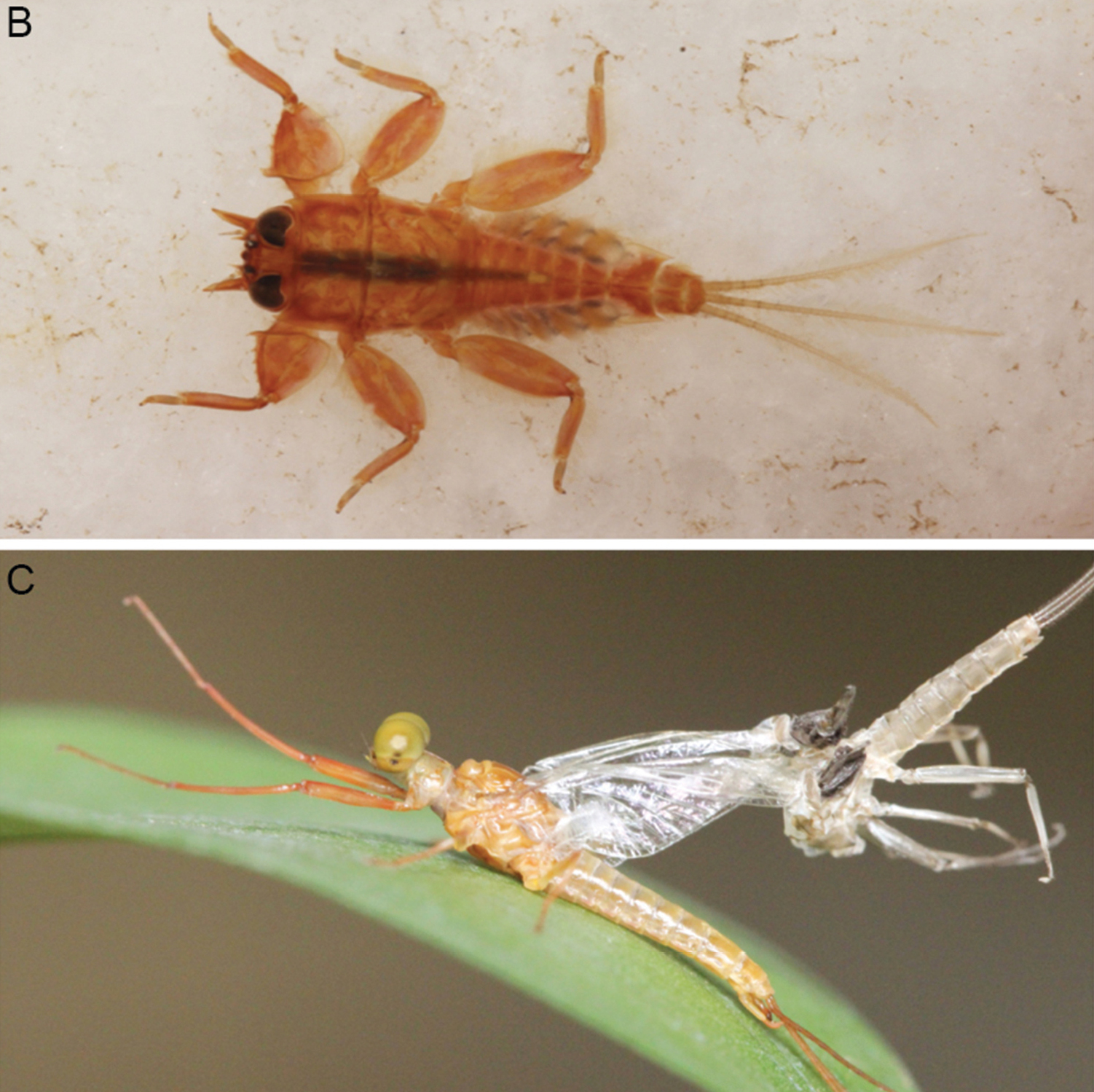
- Larvae (top) and moulting adult (bottom) of Vietnamella thani
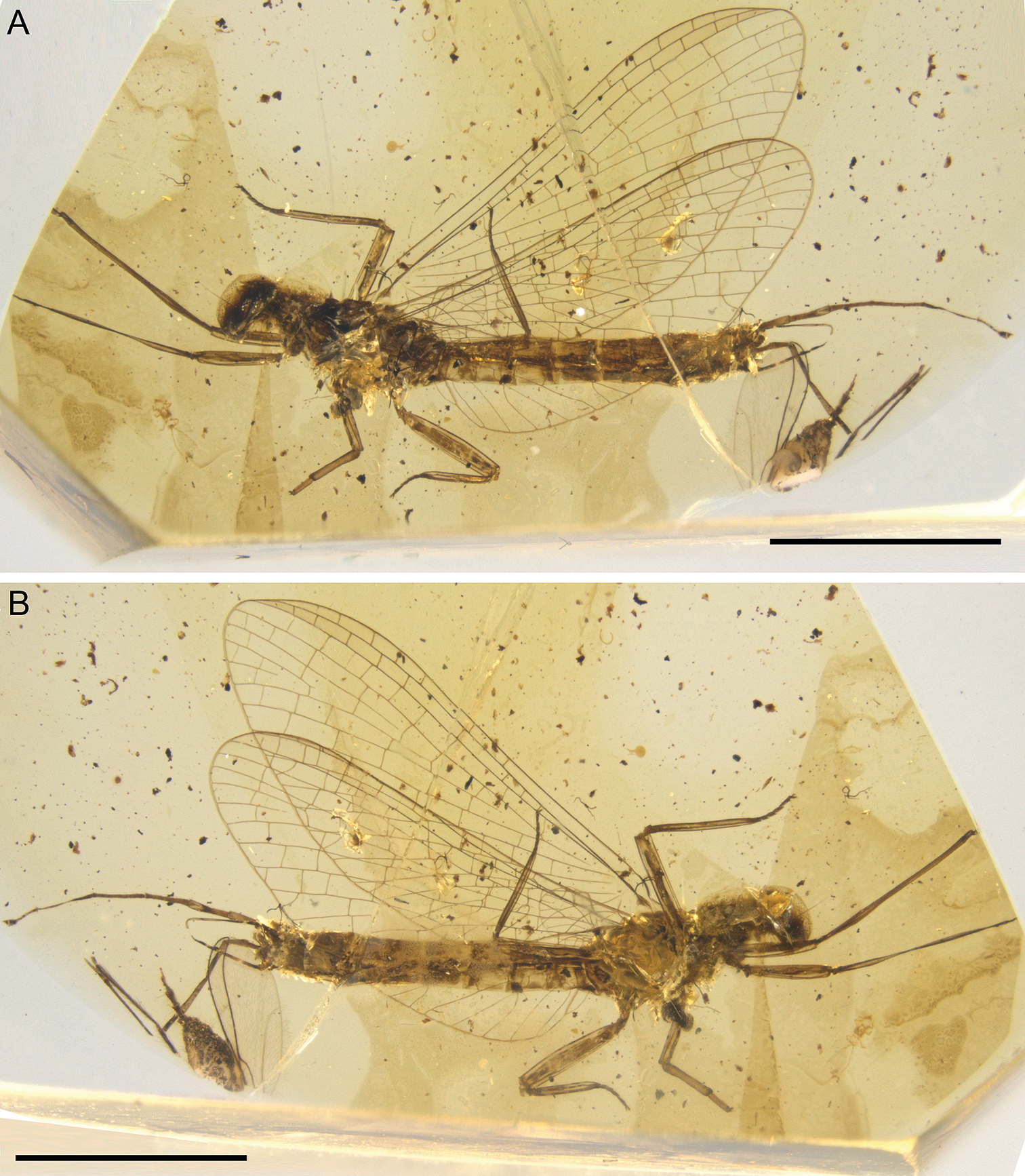
- Adult imago of Burmella paucivenosa

Scientific classification
- Domain: Eukaryota
- Kingdom: Animalia
- Phylum: Arthropoda
- Class: Insecta
- Order: Ephemeroptera
- Superfamily: Ephemerelloidea
- Family: Vietnamellidae; Allen, 1984

Genera
- Vietnamella; †Burmella

= Vietnamellidae =

Vietnamellidae Temporal range: Cenomanian-Present

Family of mayflies

Vietnamellidae is a family of ephemerelloid mayflies. It contains a single extant genus, Vietnamella, with several species native to India, Southeast Asia, and China. A fossil genus Burmella is known from the Burmese amber of Myanmar, dating to the mid-Cretaceous around 100 million years ago.

== Taxonomy ==
- Vietnamella Tshernova, 1972
  - V. thani Tshernova, 1972
  - V. ornata Tshernova, 1972
  - V. sinensis (Hsu, 1936)
  - V. maculosa Auychinda et al. 2020
  - V. nanensis Auychinda et al. 2020
  - V. chebalingensis Tong, 2020
- †Burmella Godunko, et al. 2021 Burmese amber, Myanmar, mid-Cretaceous (Albian-Cenomanian)
  - †B. paucivenosa Godunko, et al. 2021
  - †B. clypeata Godunko, et al. 2021
