= Cerny-en-Laonnois =

- Commune
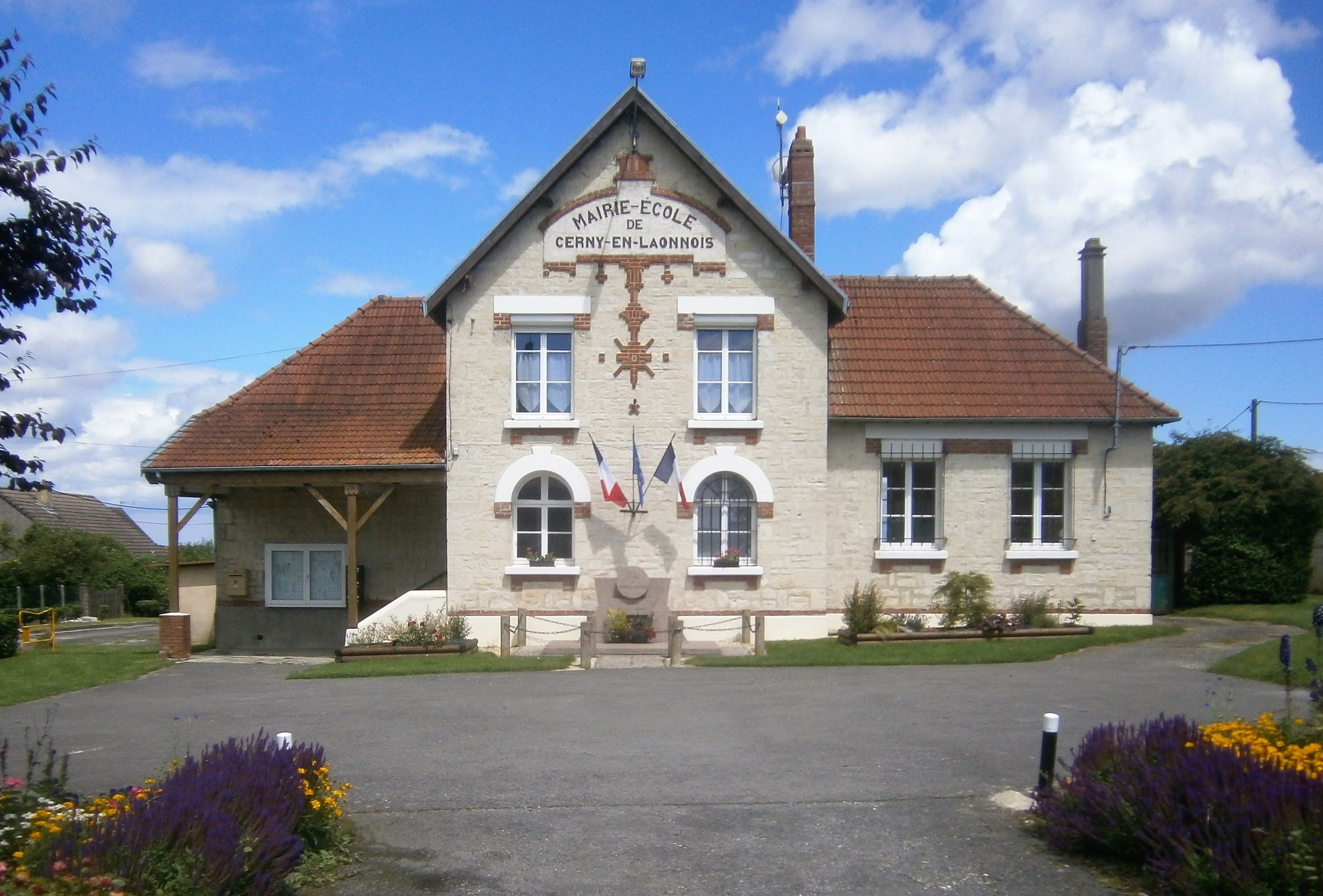
- The town hall of Cerny-en-Laonnois
- Location of Cerny-en-Laonnois
- Location within France Location within Hauts-de-France
- Coordinates: 49°26′38″N 3°40′07″E
- Country: France
- Region: Hauts-de-France
- Department: Aisne
- Arrondissement: Laon
- Canton: Laon-2
- Intercommunality: CA Pays de Laon

Government
  - Mayor (2026–32): Yohan Vitu
- Area^{1}: 7.22 km^{2} (2.79 sq mi)
- Highest elevation: 194 m (636 ft)
- Lowest elevation: 74 m (243 ft)
- Population (2023): 63
  - Density: 8.7/km^{2} (23/sq mi)
- Time zone: UTC+01:00 (CET)
  - Summer (DST): UTC+02:00 (CEST)
- INSEE/Postal code: 02150 /02860
- ^{1} French Land Register data, which excludes lakes, ponds, glaciers > 1 km^{2} (0.386 sq mi or 247 acres) and river estuaries.

Cerny-en-Laonnois is a commune in the Aisne department in Hauts-de-France in northern France.

== Geography ==
The lac de l'Ailette forms all of the commune's northern border.

== Population ==
Historical population
Year	Pop.	±% p.a.
1968	41	—
1975	34	−2.64%
1982	55	+7.11%
1990	49	−1.43%
1999	54	+1.09%
2007	72	+3.66%
2012	72	+0.00%
2017	64	−2.33%
2023	63	−0.26%
Source: INSEE

== See also ==
- Communes of the Aisne department
