= Caenis latipennis =

Scientific classification
- Domain: Eukaryota
- Kingdom: Animalia
- Phylum: Arthropoda
- Class: Insecta
- Order: Ephemeroptera
- Family: Caenidae
- Genus: Caenis
- Species: C. latipennis

Binomial name
- Caenis latipennis Banks, 1907

Synonyms
- Caenis delicata Traver, 1935; Caenis forcipata McDunnough, 1931; Caenis gigas Burks, 1953; Caenis jocosa McDunnough, 1931

Species of mayfly

Caenis latipennis is a species of small squaregilled mayfly in the family Caenidae. It is found in Central America and North America. In North America its range includes all of Canada, all of Mexico, and the continental United States.
