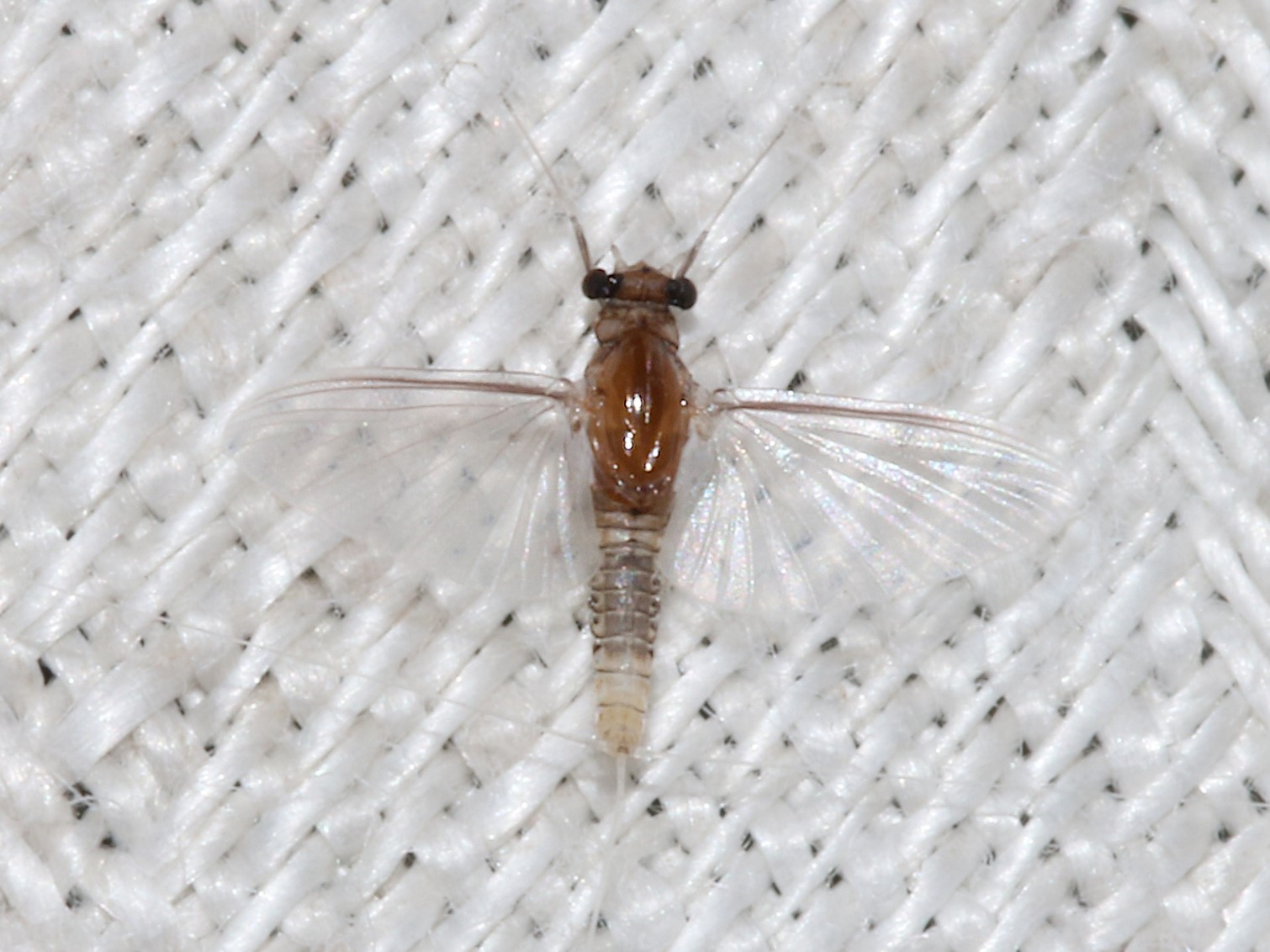

Scientific classification
- Domain: Eukaryota
- Kingdom: Animalia
- Phylum: Arthropoda
- Class: Insecta
- Order: Ephemeroptera
- Family: Caenidae
- Genus: Caenis
- Species: C. amica

Binomial name
- Caenis amica Hagen, 1861

= Caenis amica =

Species of mayfly

Caenis amica is a species of mayfly in the genus Caenis. As with most mayflies, it has an average adult lifespan of only a few days and lives near rivers in the Americas.
