= Baetisca lacustris =

Scientific classification
- Domain: Eukaryota
- Kingdom: Animalia
- Phylum: Arthropoda
- Class: Insecta
- Order: Ephemeroptera
- Family: Baetiscidae
- Genus: Baetisca
- Species: B. lacustris

Binomial name
- Baetisca lacustris McDunnough, 1932

Synonyms
- Baetisca bajkovi Neave, 1934

Species of mayfly

Baetisca lacustris is a species of armored mayfly in the family Baetiscidae. It is found in North America.
