= Caenis arwini =

Scientific classification
- Domain: Eukaryota
- Kingdom: Animalia
- Phylum: Arthropoda
- Class: Insecta
- Order: Ephemeroptera
- Family: Caenidae
- Genus: Caenis
- Species: C. arwini

Binomial name
- Caenis arwini McCafferty & Davis, 2001

Species of mayfly

Caenis anceps is a species of mayfly in the genus Caenis.
