= Caenis youngi =

Scientific classification
- Domain: Eukaryota
- Kingdom: Animalia
- Phylum: Arthropoda
- Class: Insecta
- Order: Ephemeroptera
- Family: Caenidae
- Genus: Caenis
- Species: C. youngi

Binomial name
- Caenis youngi Roemhild, 1984

Species of mayfly

Caenis youngi is a species of mayfly in the genus Caenis.
