= Caenis diminuta =

Scientific classification
- Domain: Eukaryota
- Kingdom: Animalia
- Phylum: Arthropoda
- Class: Insecta
- Order: Ephemeroptera
- Family: Caenidae
- Genus: Caenis
- Species: C. diminuta

Binomial name
- Caenis diminuta Walker, 1853

Species of mayfly

Caenis diminuta is a species of small squaregilled mayfly in the family Caenidae. It is found in Central America and North America.

== Subspecies ==
These two subspecies belong to the species Caenis diminuta:

- Caenis diminuta diminuta Walker, 1853
- Caenis diminuta latina McCafferty & Lugo-Ortiz, 1992
