= Caenis candida =

Scientific classification
- Kingdom: Animalia
- Phylum: Arthropoda
- Clade: Pancrustacea
- Class: Insecta
- Order: Ephemeroptera
- Family: Caenidae
- Genus: Caenis
- Species: C. candida

Binomial name
- Caenis candida Harper & Harper, 1981

Species of mayfly

Caenis candida is a species of mayfly in the genus Caenis. It is endemic to Quebec, Canada.
