= Caenis macafferti =

Scientific classification
- Domain: Eukaryota
- Kingdom: Animalia
- Phylum: Arthropoda
- Class: Insecta
- Order: Ephemeroptera
- Family: Caenidae
- Genus: Caenis
- Species: C. macafferti

Binomial name
- Caenis macafferti Provonsha, 1990

Species of mayfly

Caenis macafferti is a species of small squaregilled mayfly in the family Caenidae. It is found in North America.
