= Baetisca laurentina =

Scientific classification
- Domain: Eukaryota
- Kingdom: Animalia
- Phylum: Arthropoda
- Class: Insecta
- Order: Ephemeroptera
- Family: Baetiscidae
- Genus: Baetisca
- Species: B. laurentina

Binomial name
- Baetisca laurentina McDunnough, 1932

Species of mayfly

Baetisca laurentina is a species of armored mayfly in the family Baetiscidae. It is found in North America.
