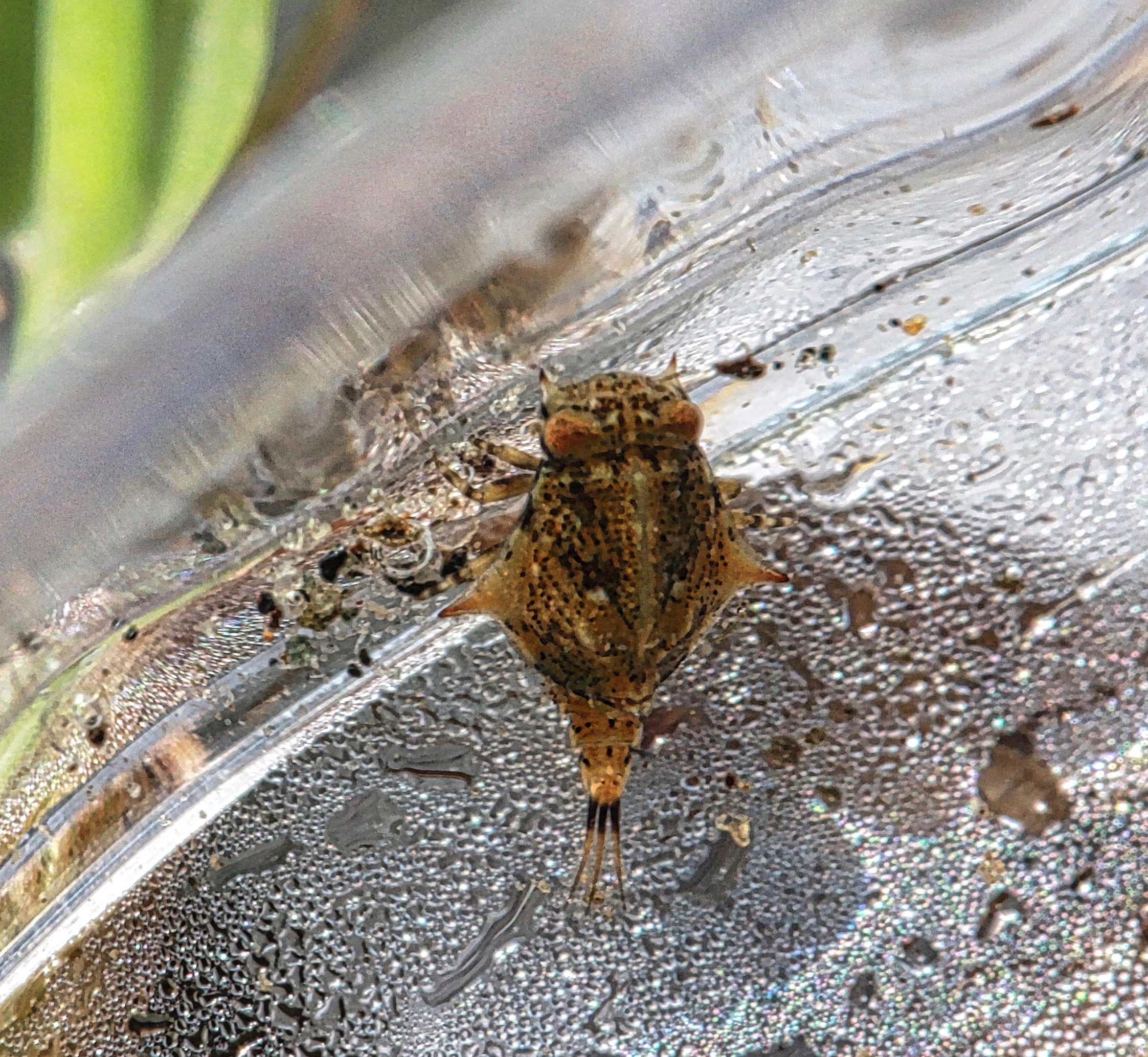

Scientific classification
- Domain: Eukaryota
- Kingdom: Animalia
- Phylum: Arthropoda
- Class: Insecta
- Order: Ephemeroptera
- Family: Baetiscidae
- Genus: Baetisca
- Species: B. berneri

Binomial name
- Baetisca berneri Tarter & Kirchner, 1978

= Baetisca berneri =

Species of mayfly

Baetisca berneri is a species of armored mayfly in the family Baetiscidae. It is found in North America.
