= Caenis bajaensis =

Scientific classification
- Domain: Eukaryota
- Kingdom: Animalia
- Phylum: Arthropoda
- Class: Insecta
- Order: Ephemeroptera
- Family: Caenidae
- Genus: Caenis
- Species: C. bajaensis

Binomial name
- Caenis bajaensis Allen & Murvosh, 1983

Species of mayfly

Caenis bajaensis is a species of mayfly in the genus Caenis.
