= Caenis luctuosa =

Scientific classification
- Kingdom: Animalia
- Phylum: Arthropoda
- Class: Insecta
- Order: Ephemeroptera
- Family: Caenidae
- Genus: Caenis
- Species: C. luctuosa

Binomial name
- Caenis luctuosa (Burmeister, 1839)

Species of mayfly

Caenis luctuosa is a species of small squaregilled mayfly in the family Caenidae. It is found in Europe.
