= Brachycercus harrisellus =

Scientific classification
- Kingdom: Animalia
- Phylum: Arthropoda
- Clade: Pancrustacea
- Class: Insecta
- Order: Ephemeroptera
- Family: Caenidae
- Genus: Brachycercus
- Species: B. harrisellus

Binomial name
- Brachycercus harrisellus Curtis, 1834

Synonyms
- Brachycercus harrisella Curtis, 1834; Brachycercus pallidus Tshernova, 1928

Species of mayfly

Brachycercus harrisellus is a species of mayfly belonging to the family Caenidae.

It is native to Europe and Northern America.
