= Chermizy-Ailles =

- Commune
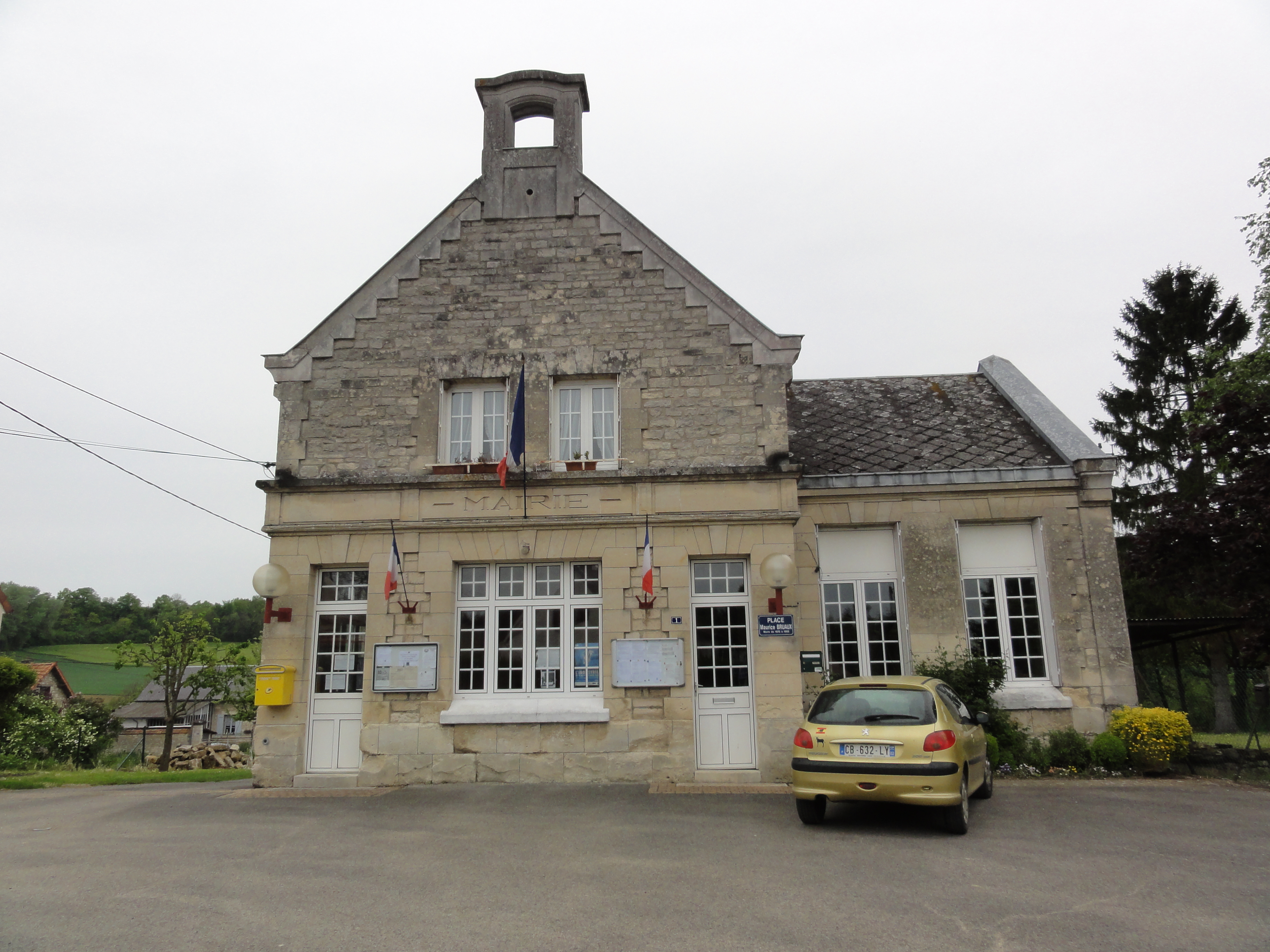
- The town hall of Chermizy-Ailles
- Location of Chermizy-Ailles
- Location within France Location within Hauts-de-France
- Coordinates: 49°28′09″N 3°43′34″E
- Country: France
- Region: Hauts-de-France
- Department: Aisne
- Arrondissement: Laon
- Canton: Villeneuve-sur-Aisne
- Intercommunality: Chemin des Dames

Government
  - Mayor (2026–32): Johnny Massart
- Area^{1}: 10.95 km^{2} (4.23 sq mi)
- Elevation: 130 m (430 ft)
- Highest elevation: 198 m (650 ft)
- Lowest elevation: 78 m (256 ft)
- Population (2023): 127
  - Density: 11.6/km^{2} (30.0/sq mi)
- Time zone: UTC+01:00 (CET)
  - Summer (DST): UTC+02:00 (CEST)
- INSEE/Postal code: 02178 /02860
- ^{1} French Land Register data, which excludes lakes, ponds, glaciers > 1 km^{2} (0.386 sq mi or 247 acres) and river estuaries.

Chermizy-Ailles is a commune in the Aisne department in Hauts-de-France in northern France.

== Geography ==
The river Ailette flows west through the commune, then flows into the lac de l'Ailette, which forms part of the commune's western border.

== Population ==
Historical population
Year	Pop.	±% p.a.
1968	80	—
1975	87	+1.21%
1982	76	−1.91%
1990	79	+0.49%
1999	70	−1.33%
2007	83	+2.15%
2012	107	+5.21%
2017	106	−0.19%
2023	127	+3.06%
Source: INSEE

== See also ==
- Communes of the Aisne department
