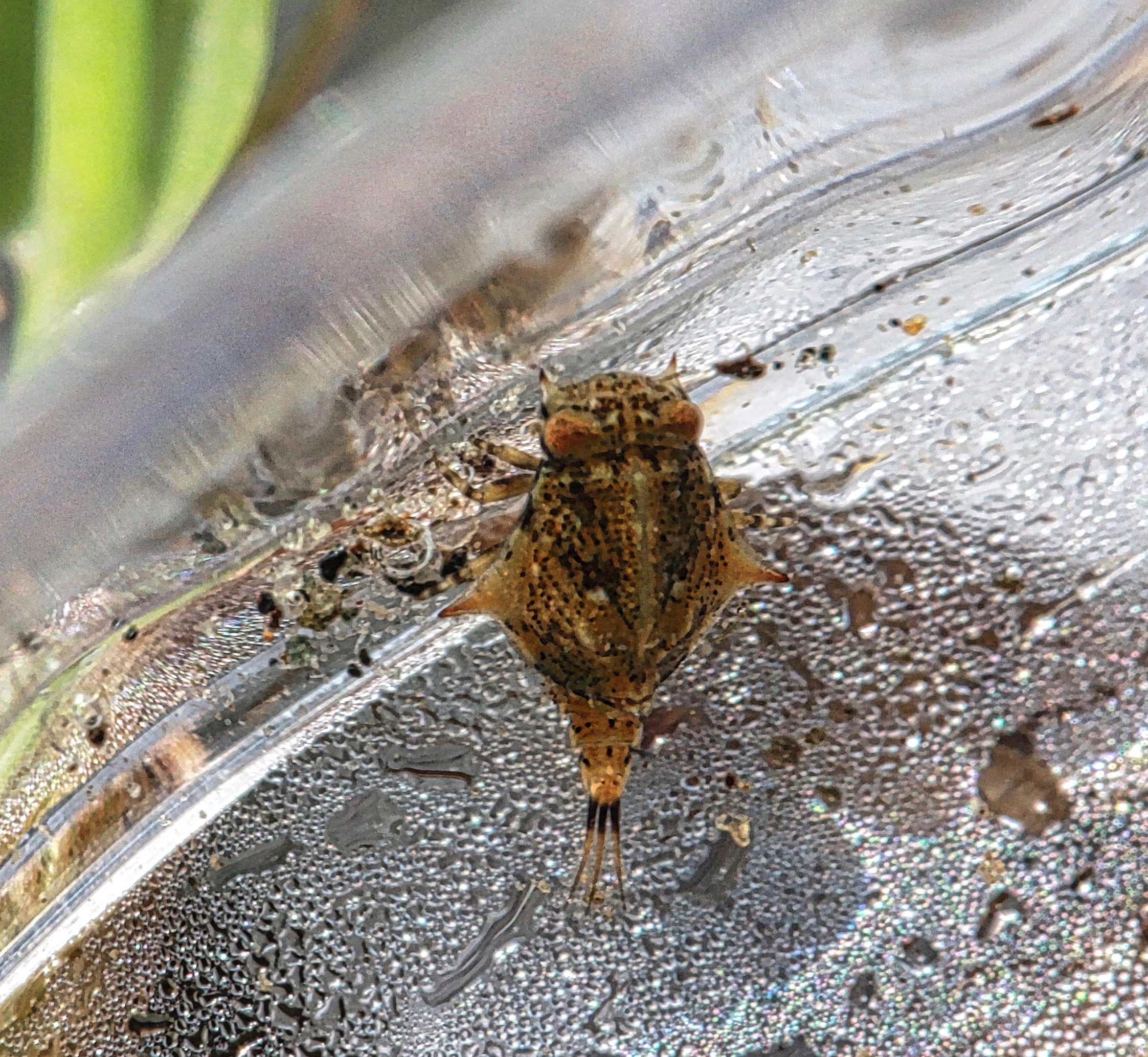
- Baetisca berneri

Scientific classification
- Domain: Eukaryota
- Kingdom: Animalia
- Phylum: Arthropoda
- Class: Insecta
- Order: Ephemeroptera
- Family: Baetiscidae
- Genus: Baetisca; Walsh, 1862

= Baetisca =

Genus of mayflies

Baetisca is a genus of armored mayflies in the family Baetiscidae. There are about 12 described species in Baetisca.

== Species ==
These 12 species belong to the genus Baetisca:

- Baetisca becki Schneider & Berner, 1963
- Baetisca berneri Tarter & Kirchner, 1978
- Baetisca callosa Traver, 1931
- Baetisca carolina Traver, 1931
- Baetisca columbiana Edmunds, 1960
- Baetisca escambiensis Berner, 1955
- Baetisca gibbera Berner, 1953
- Baetisca lacustris McDunnough, 1932
- Baetisca laurentina McDunnough, 1932
- Baetisca obesa (Say, 1839)
- Baetisca rogersi Berner, 1940
- Baetisca rubescens (Provancher, 1878)
