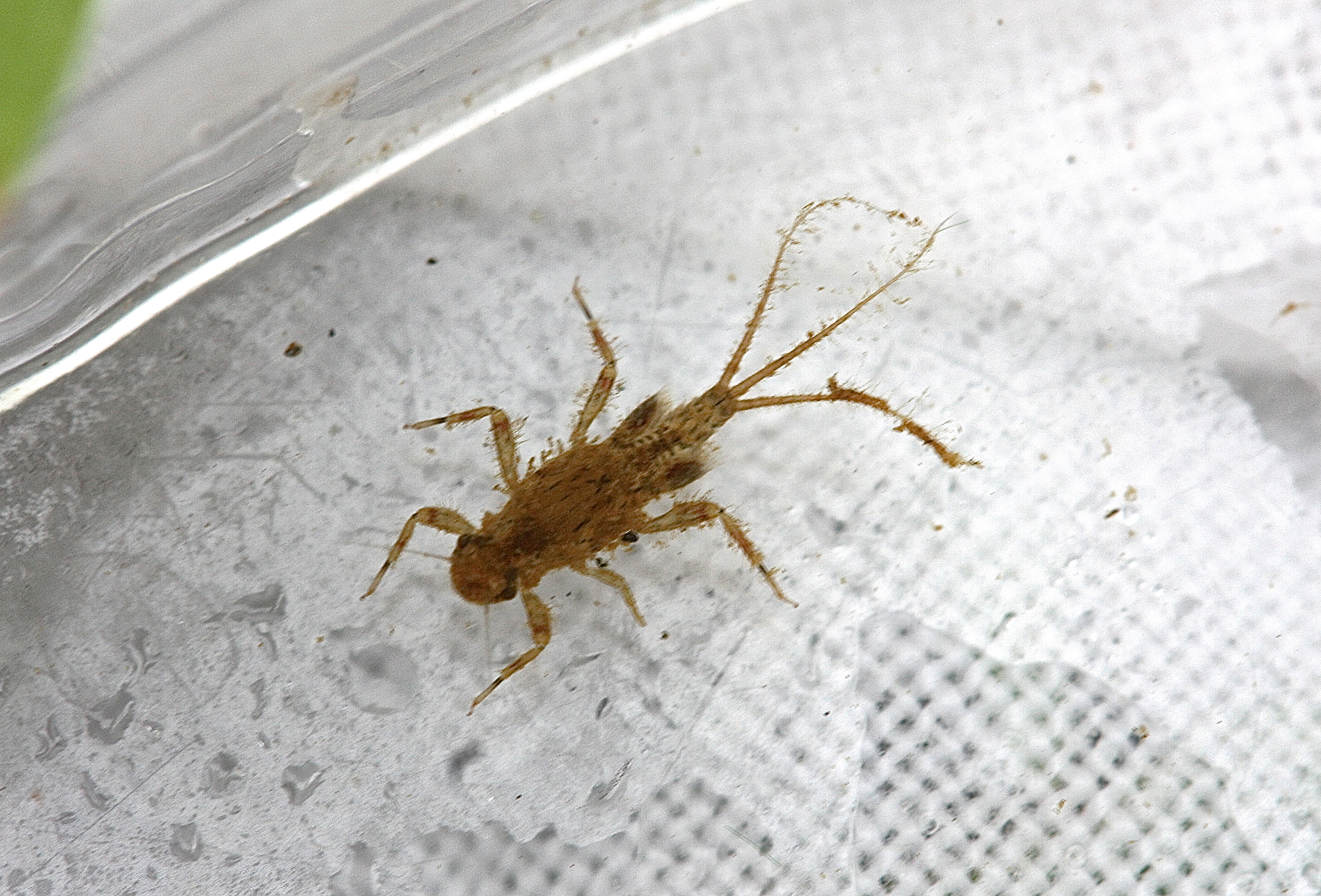

Scientific classification
- Domain: Eukaryota
- Kingdom: Animalia
- Phylum: Arthropoda
- Class: Insecta
- Order: Ephemeroptera
- Family: Leptohyphidae
- Genus: Tricorythodes; Ulmer, 1920

= Tricorythodes =

Genus of mayflies

Tricorythodes is a genus of little stout crawler mayflies in the family Leptohyphidae. There are about 16 described species in Tricorythodes.

== Species ==
- Tricorythodes albilineatus Berner, 1946
- Tricorythodes allectus (Needham, 1905)
- Tricorythodes cobbi Alba-Tercedor and Flannagan, 1995
- Tricorythodes comus Traver, 1959
- Tricorythodes costaricanus (Ulmer, 1920)
- Tricorythodes curvatus Allen, 1977
- Tricorythodes explicatus (Eaton, 1892)
- Tricorythodes fictus Traver, 1935
- Tricorythodes kirki Baumgardner, 2007
- Tricorythodes mosegus Alba-Tercedor and Flannagan, 1995
- Tricorythodes notatus Allen and Brusca, 1973
- Tricorythodes primus Baumgardner, 2007
- Tricorythodes robacki (Allen, 1967)
- Tricorythodes sordidus Allen, 1967
- Tricorythodes stygiatus McDunnough, 1931
- Tricorythodes ulmeri Allen and Brusca, 1973
