= Chamouille =

- Commune
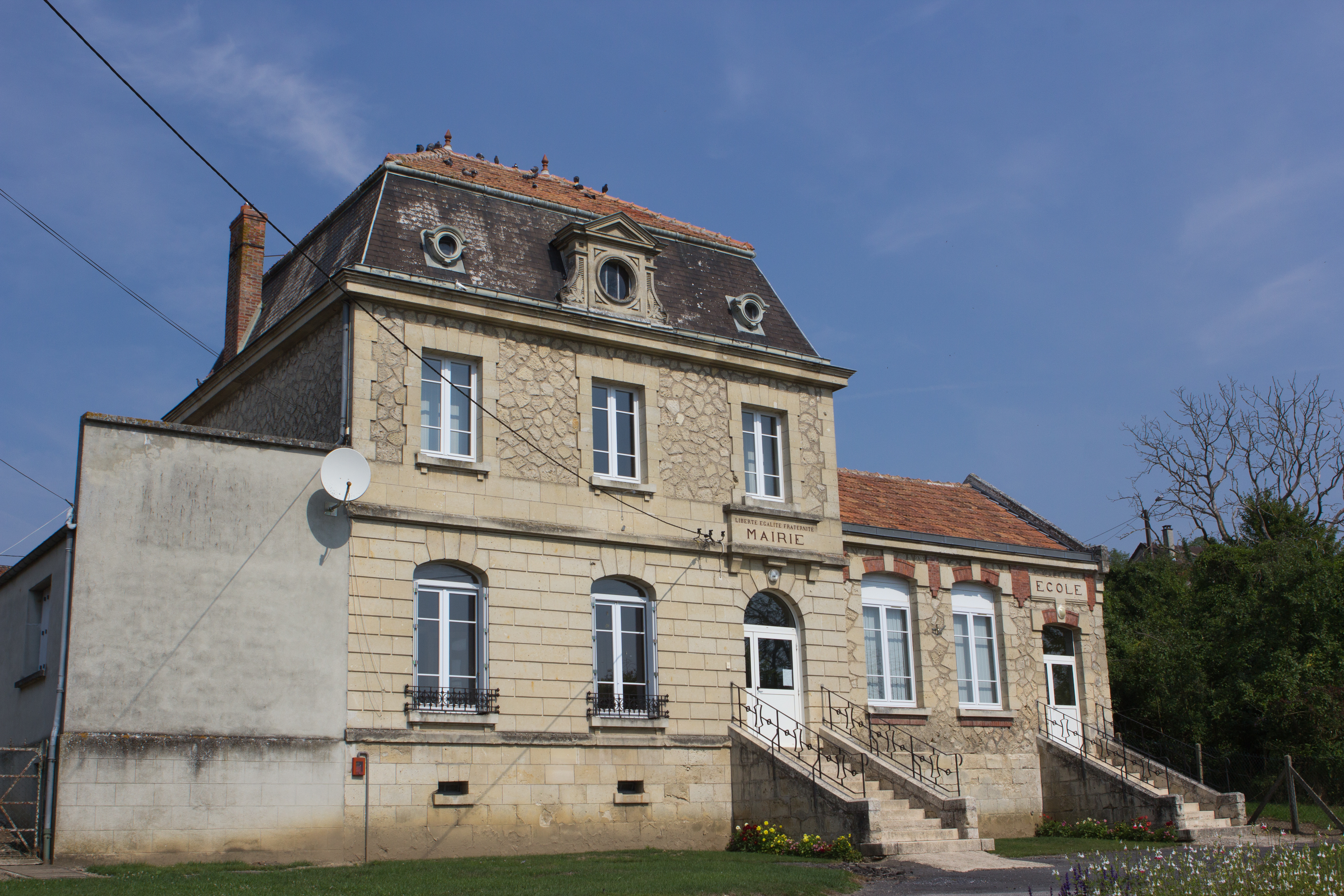
- The town hall and school of Chamouille

- Coat of arms
- Location of Chamouille
- Location within France Location within Hauts-de-France
- Coordinates: 49°28′30″N 3°39′59″E
- Country: France
- Region: Hauts-de-France
- Department: Aisne
- Arrondissement: Laon
- Canton: Laon-2
- Intercommunality: CA Pays de Laon

Government
  - Mayor (2026–32): Francis Léauté
- Area^{1}: 3.34 km^{2} (1.29 sq mi)
- Elevation: 112 m (367 ft)
- Highest elevation: 179 m (587 ft)
- Lowest elevation: 72 m (236 ft)
- Population (2023): 272
  - Density: 81.4/km^{2} (211/sq mi)
- Time zone: UTC+01:00 (CET)
  - Summer (DST): UTC+02:00 (CEST)
- INSEE/Postal code: 02158 /02860
- ^{1} French Land Register data, which excludes lakes, ponds, glaciers > 1 km^{2} (0.386 sq mi or 247 acres) and river estuaries.

Chamouille (French pronunciation: [ʃamuj]) is a commune in the Aisne department in Hauts-de-France in northern France.

== Geography ==
The lac de l'Ailette forms most of the commune's southern border.

== Population ==
Historical population
Year	Pop.	±% p.a.
1968	128	—
1975	142	+1.49%
1982	153	+1.07%
1990	147	−0.50%
1999	204	+3.71%
2007	241	+2.11%
2012	271	+2.37%
2017	284	+0.94%
2023	272	−0.72%
Source: INSEE

== See also ==
- Communes of the Aisne department
