= Leptohyphodes =

Scientific classification
- Domain: Eukaryota
- Kingdom: Animalia
- Phylum: Arthropoda
- Class: Insecta
- Order: Ephemeroptera
- Family: Leptohyphidae
- Genus: Leptohyphodes; Ulmer, 1920
- Species: L. inanis

Binomial name
- Leptohyphodes inanis (Pictet, 1843)

Genus of mayflies

Leptohyphodes is a genus of little stout crawler mayflies in the family Leptohyphidae. There is one described species in Leptohyphodes, L. inanis.
