= Leptohyphes =

Scientific classification
- Domain: Eukaryota
- Kingdom: Animalia
- Phylum: Arthropoda
- Class: Insecta
- Order: Ephemeroptera
- Family: Leptohyphidae
- Genus: Leptohyphes; Eaton, 1882

Genus of mayflies

Leptohyphes is a genus of little stout crawler mayflies in the family Leptohyphidae. There are about 18 described species in Leptohyphes.

== Species ==
- Leptohyphes alleni Brusca, 1971
- Leptohyphes berneri Traver, 1958
- Leptohyphes brevissimus Eaton, 1892
- Leptohyphes brunneus Allen and Brusca, 1973
- Leptohyphes castaneus Allen, 1967
- Leptohyphes lestes Allen and Brusca, 1973
- Leptohyphes mandibulus Baumgardner, 2007
- Leptohyphes murdochi Allen, 1967
- Leptohyphes musseri Allen, 1967
- Leptohyphes nigripunctus Traver, 1943
- Leptohyphes peterseni Ulmer, 1920
- Leptohyphes pilosus Allen and Brusca, 1973
- Leptohyphes priapus Traver, 1958
- Leptohyphes sabinas Traver, 1958
- Leptohyphes spiculatus Allen and Brusca, 1973
- Leptohyphes tarsos Allen and Murvosh, 1987
- Leptohyphes vulturnus Allen, 1978
- Leptohyphes zalope Traver, 1958
