= Irpacaenis =

Scientific classification
- Domain: Eukaryota
- Kingdom: Animalia
- Phylum: Arthropoda
- Class: Insecta
- Order: Ephemeroptera
- Family: Caenidae
- Genus: Irpacaenis; Suter, 1999

Genus of mayflies

Irpacaenis is a genus of small squaregilled mayflies in the family Caenidae. There are at least three described species in Irpacaenis.

== Species ==
These three species belong to the genus Irpacaenis:

- Irpacaenis coolooli Suter, 1999
- Irpacaenis deani Suter, 1999
- Irpacaenis kaapi Suter, 1999
