= Amanahyphes =

Scientific classification
- Domain: Eukaryota
- Kingdom: Animalia
- Phylum: Arthropoda
- Class: Insecta
- Order: Ephemeroptera
- Family: Leptohyphidae
- Genus: Amanahyphes; Salles & Molineri, 2006

Genus of mayflies

Amanahyphes is a genus of little stout crawler mayflies in the family Leptohyphidae. There are at least two described species in Amanahyphes.

== Species ==
These two species belong to the genus Amanahyphes:

- Amanahyphes bahiensis
- Amanahyphes saguassu Salles & Molineri, 2006
