= Traverhyphes =

Scientific classification
- Domain: Eukaryota
- Kingdom: Animalia
- Phylum: Arthropoda
- Class: Insecta
- Order: Ephemeroptera
- Family: Leptohyphidae
- Genus: Traverhyphes; Molineri, 2001

Genus of mayflies

Traverhyphes is a genus of little stout crawler mayflies in the family Leptohyphidae. There are about seven described species in Traverhyphes.

== Species ==
These seven species belong to the genus Traverhyphes:

- Traverhyphes chiquitano Molineri, 2004
- Traverhyphes frevo Lima, Salles & Pinheiro, 2011
- Traverhyphes indicator (Needham & Murphy, 1924)
- Traverhyphes nanus (Allen, 1967)
- Traverhyphes pirai Molineri, 2001
- Traverhyphes yuati Molineri, 2004
- Traverhyphes yuqui Molineri, 2004
