= Macunahyphes =

Scientific classification
- Domain: Eukaryota
- Kingdom: Animalia
- Phylum: Arthropoda
- Class: Insecta
- Order: Ephemeroptera
- Family: Leptohyphidae
- Genus: Macunahyphes; Dias, Salles & Molineri, 2005

Genus of mayflies

Macunahyphes is a genus of little stout crawler mayflies in the family Leptohyphidae. There are about six described species in Macunahyphes.

== Species ==
These six species belong to the genus Macunahyphes:

- Macunahyphes araca Souto & Salles, 2016
- Macunahyphes australis (Banks, 1913)
- Macunahyphes eduardoi Almeida & Mariano, 2015
- Macunahyphes incognitus Molineri, Grillet, Nieto, Domínguez & Guerrero, 2011
- Macunahyphes pemonensis Molineri, Grillet, Nieto, Domínguez & Guerrero, 2011
- Macunahyphes zagaia Souto & Salles, 2016
