= Tricorythopsis =

Scientific classification
- Domain: Eukaryota
- Kingdom: Animalia
- Phylum: Arthropoda
- Class: Insecta
- Order: Ephemeroptera
- Family: Leptohyphidae
- Genus: Tricorythopsis; Traver, 1958

Genus of mayflies

Tricorythopsis is a genus of little stout crawler mayflies in the family Leptohyphidae. There are more than 20 described species in Tricorythopsis.

== Species ==
These 21 species belong to the genus Tricorythopsis:

- Tricorythopsis acara Belmont, Salles & Hamada, 2011
- Tricorythopsis araponga Dias & Salles, 2005
- Tricorythopsis ariagas
- Tricorythopsis artigas Traver, 1958
- Tricorythopsis bahiensis Dias, Salles & Ferreira, 2008
- Tricorythopsis baptistai Dias & Salles, 2005
- Tricorythopsis chiriguano Molineri, 2001
- Tricorythopsis faeculopsis Belmont, Salles & Hamada, 2011
- Tricorythopsis gibbus (Allen, 1967)
- Tricorythopsis intercalatus Belmont, Salles & Hamada, 2011
- Tricorythopsis minimus (Allen, 1973)
- Tricorythopsis pseudogibbus Dias & Salles, 2005
- Tricorythopsis rondoniensis (Dias, Cruz & Ferreira, 2009)
- Tricorythopsis sigillatus Molineri, 1999
- Tricorythopsis spongicola Lima, Salles & Pinheiro, 2011
- Tricorythopsis ticuna Molineri & Zuniga, 2006
- Tricorythopsis undulatus (Allen, 1967)
- Tricorythopsis volsellus Molineri, 1999
- Tricorythopsis yacutinga Molineri, 2001
- Tricorythopsis yucupe Dias, Salles & Ferreira, 2008
- Tricorythopsis yusuaia
