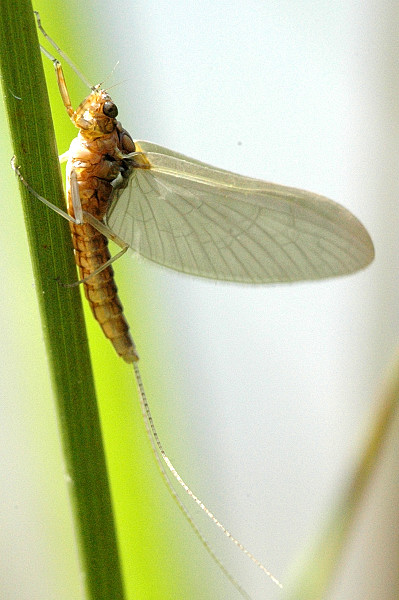
- Caenis horaria

Scientific classification
- Kingdom: Animalia
- Phylum: Arthropoda
- Clade: Pancrustacea
- Class: Insecta
- Order: Ephemeroptera
- Family: Caenidae
- Genus: Caenis; Stephens, 1835

= Caenis (mayfly) =

Genus of mayflies

Caenis is a genus of mayflies. They are very small in size, sometimes with a body of only an 1/8 of an inch (3.2 mm).

== Distribution and ecology ==
Caenis is one of the most abundant mayfly genera of the Holarctic. Larvae can occur in high densities on the bottoms of shallow ponds and lakes up to an altitude of 1800 meters in the [Alps].

Densities of 700-1700 larvae per square meter have been reported for C. luctuosa and C. horaria on bottoms covered with organic detritus or decaying leaves. Densities on mineral sediments are an order of magnitude lower (4-330 animals per square meter).

== Species ==
The following are included in BioLib.cz:

1. Caenis abdita Malzacher, 2013
2. Caenis acutostilata Malzacher, 2021
3. Caenis aethiopica Navás, 1935
4. Caenis afrocaenoides Malzacher, 2021
5. Caenis alicae Malzacher, 1990
6. Caenis americani Srinivasan, Sivaruban, Barathy, Malzacher & Isack, 2021
7. Caenis amica Hagen, 1861
8. Caenis amurensis Kluge, 1986
9. Caenis anceps Traver, 1935
10. Caenis antelucana Malzacher, 1990
11. Caenis antoniae Malzacher, 1992
12. Caenis argentina Navás, 1915
13. Caenis argillosa Kang & Yang, 1994
14. Caenis arunachalami Srinivasan et al., 2023
15. Caenis arwini McCafferty & Davis, 2001
16. Caenis aspera Tong & Dudgeon, 2002
17. Caenis bajaensis Allen & Murvosh, 1983
18. Caenis basuto Demoulin, 1970
19. Caenis belfiorei Malzacher, 1986
20. Caenis bella Kang & Yang, 1994
21. Caenis berneri Kimmins, 1956
22. Caenis beskidensis Sowa, 1973
23. Caenis bicornis Tong & Dudgeon, 2002
24. Caenis binda Suter, Mynott & Webb, 2023
25. Caenis brevipes Kimmins, 1956
26. Caenis burmeisteri Malzacher, 1990
27. Caenis candelata Malzacher, 1986
28. Caenis candida Harper & Harper, 1981
29. Caenis capensis (Barnard, 1932)
30. Caenis carloi Thomas, Marie & Dia, 2000
31. Caenis catherinae Hofmann & Thomas, 1999
32. Caenis chamie Alba-Tercedor & Mosquera, 1999
33. Caenis cibaria Eaton, 1879
34. Caenis cigana Pereira & Da-Silva, 1990
35. Caenis cincta Demoulin, 1956
36. Caenis corana Thomas & Sartori, 1989
37. Caenis corbeti Malzacher, 1990
38. Caenis cornigera Kang & Yang, 1994
39. Caenis cornuta (Tshernova, 1952)
40. Caenis corpulenta Kang & Yang, 1994
41. Caenis cubensis Malzacher, Naranjo, González-Lazo & Kluge, 2007
42. Caenis cuniana Froehlich, 1969
43. Caenis dangi (Soldán, 1986)
44. Caenis demoulini van Bruggen, 1954
45. Caenis diminuta Walker, 1853
46. Caenis dominguezi Malzacher, 2001
47. Caenis douglasi Malzacher, 1993
48. Caenis duodecima Malzacher, 1990
49. Caenis edwardsi Kimmins, 1939
50. Caenis eglinensis Pescador & Richard, 2006
51. Caenis elouardi Malzacher, 1990
52. Caenis fasciata Navás, 1927
53. Caenis femina Hofmann & Sartori, 1999
54. Caenis fittkaui Malzacher, 1986
55. Caenis fregatula Malzacher, 2013
56. Caenis gattolliati Malzacher, 2010
57. Caenis ghibana Malzacher, 1990
58. Caenis gilbonensis Malzacher, 1992
59. Caenis gilliesi Malzacher, 1990
60. Caenis gonseri Malzacher, 2001
61. Caenis grafi Malzacher, 2021
62. Caenis granifera Kang & Yang, 1994
63. Caenis gretathunbergae Malzacher, 2021
64. Caenis hanleyi Suter, Mynott & Webb, 2023
65. Caenis helenae Malzacher, 2012
66. Caenis hilaris (Say, 1839)
67. Caenis hissari Kluge, 1985
68. Caenis hoggariensis Grandi, 1951
69. Caenis horaria (Linnaeus, 1758)
70. Caenis inflexa (Kopelke, 1981)
71. Caenis insularis Demoulin, 1969
72. Caenis jinjana Kimmins, 1956
73. Caenis jinjanoides Malzacher, 2011
74. Caenis johannae Malzacher, 1996
75. Caenis jungi Braasch, 1980
76. Caenis kaegies Srinivasan et al., 2023
77. Caenis karenae Malzacher, 2021
78. Caenis kimminsis Ali, 1967
79. Caenis kivuensis Demoulin, 1956
80. Caenis knowlesi Gillies & Knowles, 1990
81. Caenis kohli Malzacher, 2011
82. Caenis kopetdagi Kluge, 1985
83. Caenis kungu Eaton, 1879
84. Caenis lactea (Burmeister, 1839)
85. Caenis latipennis Banks, 1907
86. Caenis liebenauae Malzacher, 1990
87. Caenis longiforcipata Malzacher, 2021
88. Caenis lubrica Tong & Dudgeon, 2002
89. Caenis luctuosa (Burmeister, 1839)
90. Caenis ludicra Navás, 1924
91. Caenis ludovici Malzacher, 2021
92. Caenis macafferti Provonsha, 1990
93. Caenis macronyx Kluge, 1986
94. Caenis macrura Stephens, 1835
95. Caenis maculata (Tshernova, 1952)
96. Caenis maduraiensis Balasubramanian & Muthukatturaja, 2021
97. Caenis magnipilosa (Kopelke, 1981)
98. Caenis malzacheri Sartori & Gattolliat, 2008
99. Caenis marataoan Nascimento et al., 2022
100. Caenis margherita Malzacher, 1990
101. Caenis martae Belfiore, 1984
102. Caenis melanoleuca Zhou & Zheng, 2004
103. Caenis miliaria (Tshernova, 1952)
104. Caenis moe Hwang & Bae, 1999
105. Caenis montana Kang & Yang, 1994
106. Caenis nachoi Alba-Tercedor & Zamora Muñoz, 1993
107. Caenis namorona Malzacher, 1995
108. Caenis nasuta Malzacher, 2021
109. Caenis nausicaae Malzacher, 2010
110. Caenis nemoralis Navás, 1922
111. Caenis nervulosa Malzacher, 1990
112. Caenis nigricola Malzacher, 2011
113. Caenis nigropunctata Klapálek, 1905
114. Caenis nishinoae Malzacher, 1996
115. Caenis nitida Kang & Yang, 1994
116. Caenis noctivaga Malzacher, 1990
117. Caenis obtusostilata Malzacher, 2021
118. Caenis occulta Malzacher, 1990
119. Caenis octulusa Malzacher, 2012
120. Caenis oromo Malzacher, 2021
121. Caenis orthostilata Malzacher, 2011
122. Caenis pallida Malzacher, 1990
123. Caenis panamensis Malzacher, 2001
124. Caenis parabrevipes Malzacher, 1992
125. Caenis parisi Malzacher, 2012
126. Caenis parviforceps (Zhou, Gui & Su, 2000)
127. Caenis perpusilla Walker, 1853
128. Caenis pflugfelderi Malzacher, 1990
129. Caenis philippinensis (Ulmer, 1924)
130. Caenis picea Kimmins, 1947
131. Caenis piscina Kimmins, 1947
132. Caenis plaumanni Malzacher, 2001
133. Caenis pseudamica Malzacher, 1990
134. Caenis pseudorivulorum Keffermüller, 1960
135. Caenis punctata McDunnough, 1931
136. Caenis pusilla Navás, 1913
137. Caenis pustula Tiunova, 1999
138. Caenis pycnacantha Jia, Qin, Ju & Zhou, 2010
139. Caenis pygmaea Costa, 1888
140. Caenis quatipuruica Malzacher, 1986
141. Caenis reissi Malzacher, 1986
142. Caenis rivulorum Eaton, 1884
143. Caenis robusta Eaton, 1885
144. Caenis rugosa Malzacher, 1995
145. Caenis rutila Malzacher, 1995
146. Caenis scotti Ulmer, 1930
147. Caenis sebastiani Malzacher, 2013
148. Caenis sigillata Malzacher, 1985
149. Caenis sinensis Gui & Zhou, 1999
150. Caenis solida Malzacher, 2010
151. Caenis spinosa Malzacher, 1995
152. Caenis srinagari Traver, 1939
153. Caenis strugaensis Ikonomov, 1961
154. Caenis subota Malzacher, 2012
155. Caenis taratopo Molineri, 2009
156. Caenis tardata McDunnough, 1931
157. Caenis teipunensis Molineri, Grillet, Nieto, Domínguez & Guerrero, 2011
158. Caenis tenella (Navás, 1932)
159. Caenis tuba Hwang & Bae, 1999
160. Caenis ulmeriana Malzacher, 2015
161. Caenis unidigitata Malzacher, 2013
162. Caenis uruzu Molineri & Malzacher, 2007
163. Caenis valentinae Grandi, 1951
164. Caenis vanuatensis Malzacher & Staniczek, 2007
165. Caenis venkataramani Srinivasan et al., 2023
166. Caenis vermifera Malzacher, 2011
167. Caenis yangi Kang & Yang, 1996
168. Caenis youngi Roemhild, 1984

== Varia ==
Imitations of this mayfly in hook sizes as small as # 28 are used for fly-fishing. Tying fly imitations this small is difficult, hence the nickname "Anglers Curse."
