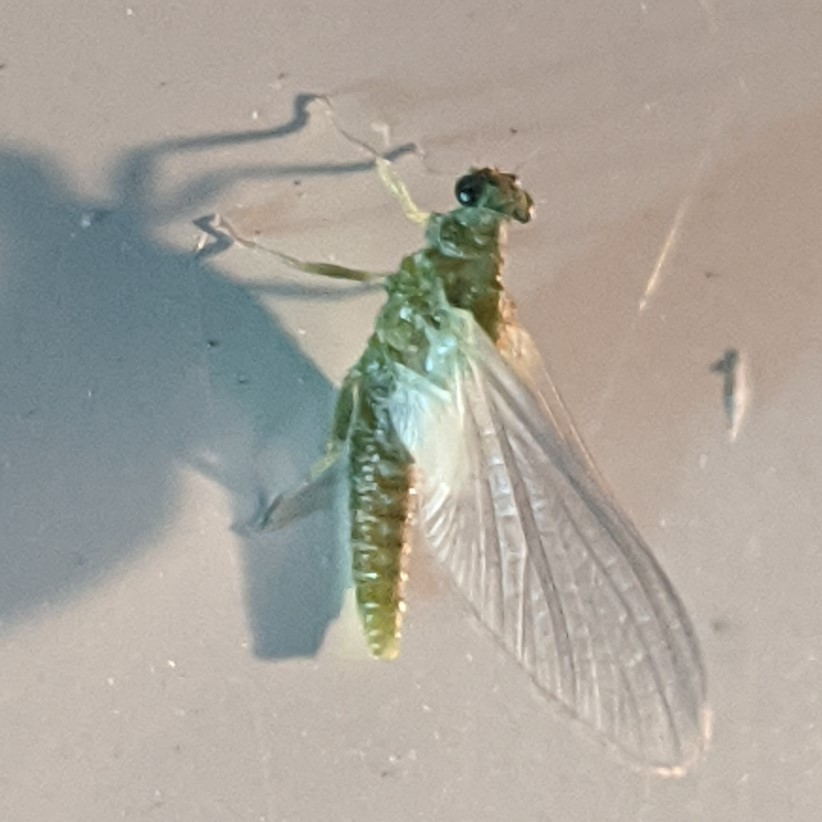

Scientific classification
- Domain: Eukaryota
- Kingdom: Animalia
- Phylum: Arthropoda
- Class: Insecta
- Order: Ephemeroptera
- Family: Caenidae
- Genus: Brachycercus; Curtis, 1834

= Brachycercus =

Genus of mayflies

Brachycercus is a genus of small squaregilled mayflies in the family Caenidae, found especially in the Palaearctic and Nearctic realms.

== Species ==
The following are included in BioLib.cz:

1. Brachycercus berneri Soldán, 1986
2. Brachycercus europaeus Kluge, 1991
3. Brachycercus harrisella Curtis, 1835
4. Brachycercus kabyliensis Soldán, 1986
5. Brachycercus nitidus (Traver, 1932)
6. Brachycercus ojibwe Sun & McCafferty, 2008
