= Tasmanocoenis =

Scientific classification
- Domain: Eukaryota
- Kingdom: Animalia
- Phylum: Arthropoda
- Class: Insecta
- Order: Ephemeroptera
- Family: Caenidae
- Genus: Tasmanocoenis; Lestage, 1930

Genus of mayflies

Tasmanocoenis is a genus of small squaregilled mayflies in the family Caenidae. There are about seven described species in Tasmanocoenis.

== Species ==
These seven species belong to the genus Tasmanocoenis:

- Tasmanocoenis arcuata Alba-Tercedor & Suter, 1990
- Tasmanocoenis jillongi Harker, 1957
- Tasmanocoenis novaegiuneae van Bruggen, 1957
- Tasmanocoenis queenslandica (Soldán, 1978)
- Tasmanocoenis rieki (Soldán, 1978)
- Tasmanocoenis tillyardi (Lestage, 1938)
- Tasmanocoenis tonnoiri Lestage, 1931
