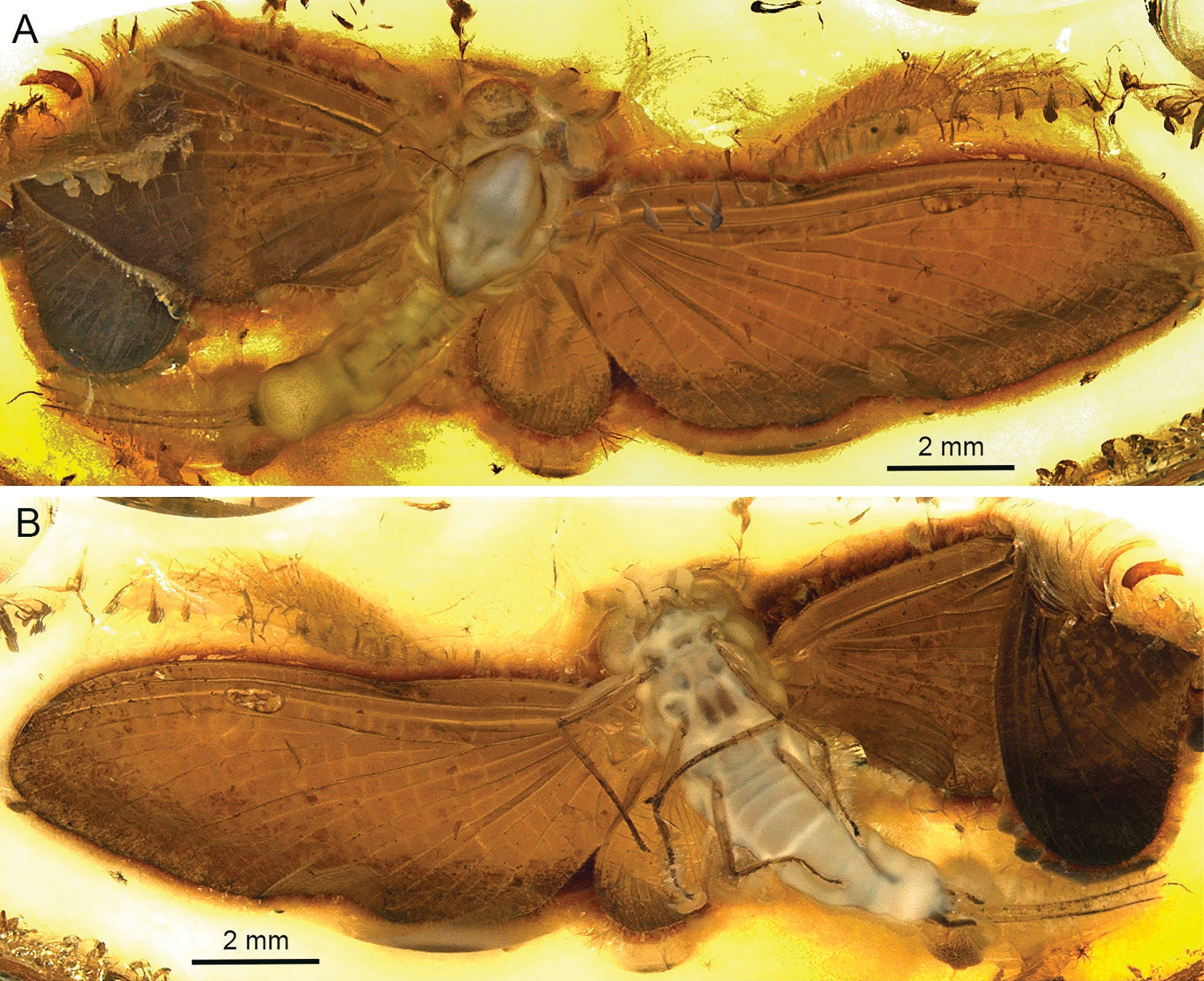

Scientific classification
- Kingdom: Animalia
- Phylum: Arthropoda
- Clade: Pancrustacea
- Class: Insecta
- Order: Ephemeroptera
- Family: Baetiscidae
- Genus: †Balticobaetisca

Type species
- Balticobaetisca velteni Staniczek & Bechly, 2002

Species
- Balticobaetisca velteni Balticobaetisca stuttgardia Balticobaetisca bispinata

= Balticobaetisca =

Balticobaetisca Temporal range: Lutetian

Extinct genus of mayfly

Balticobaetisca is an extinct genus of baetiscid mayfly from the Lutetian age of the Baltic region.
