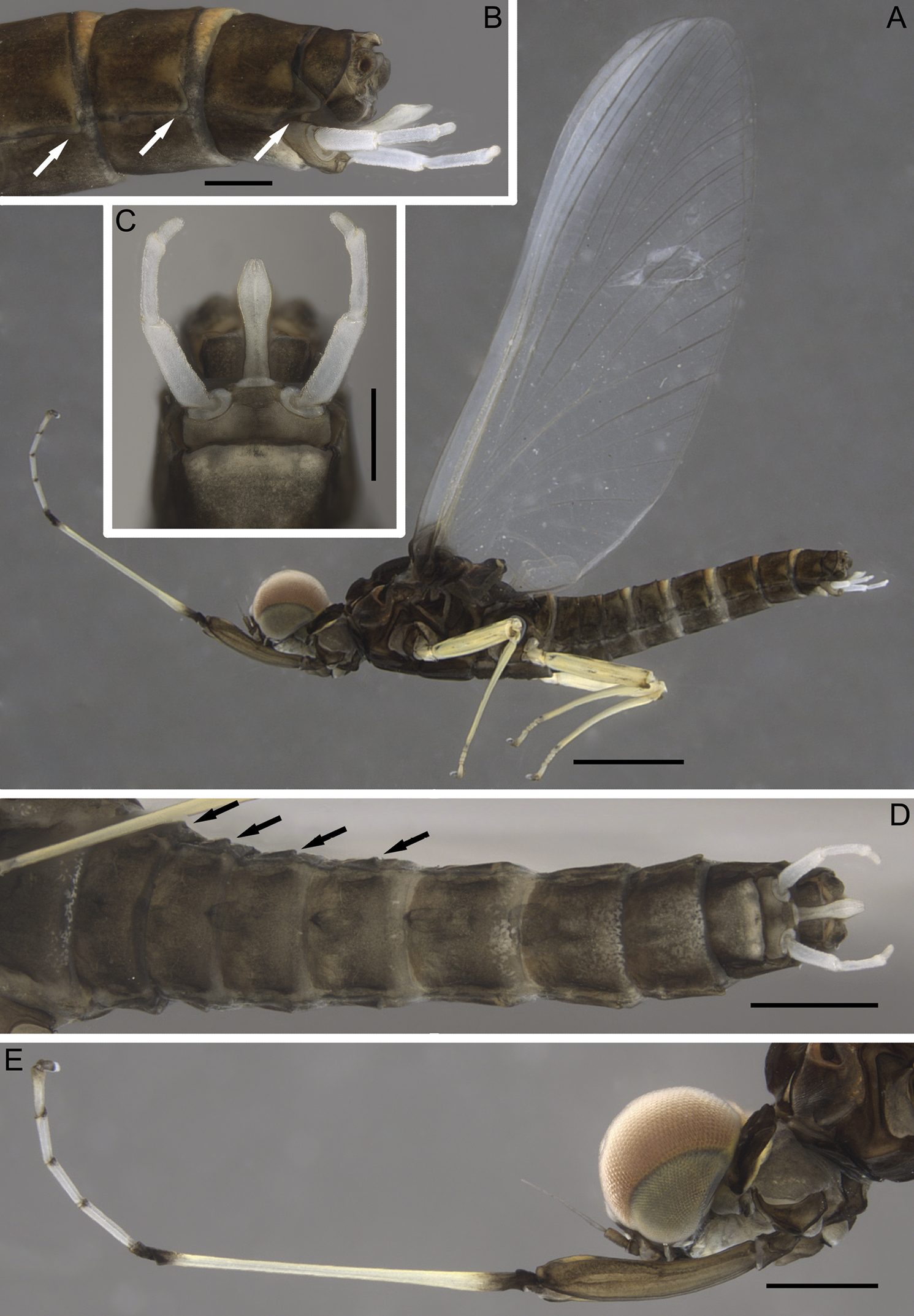

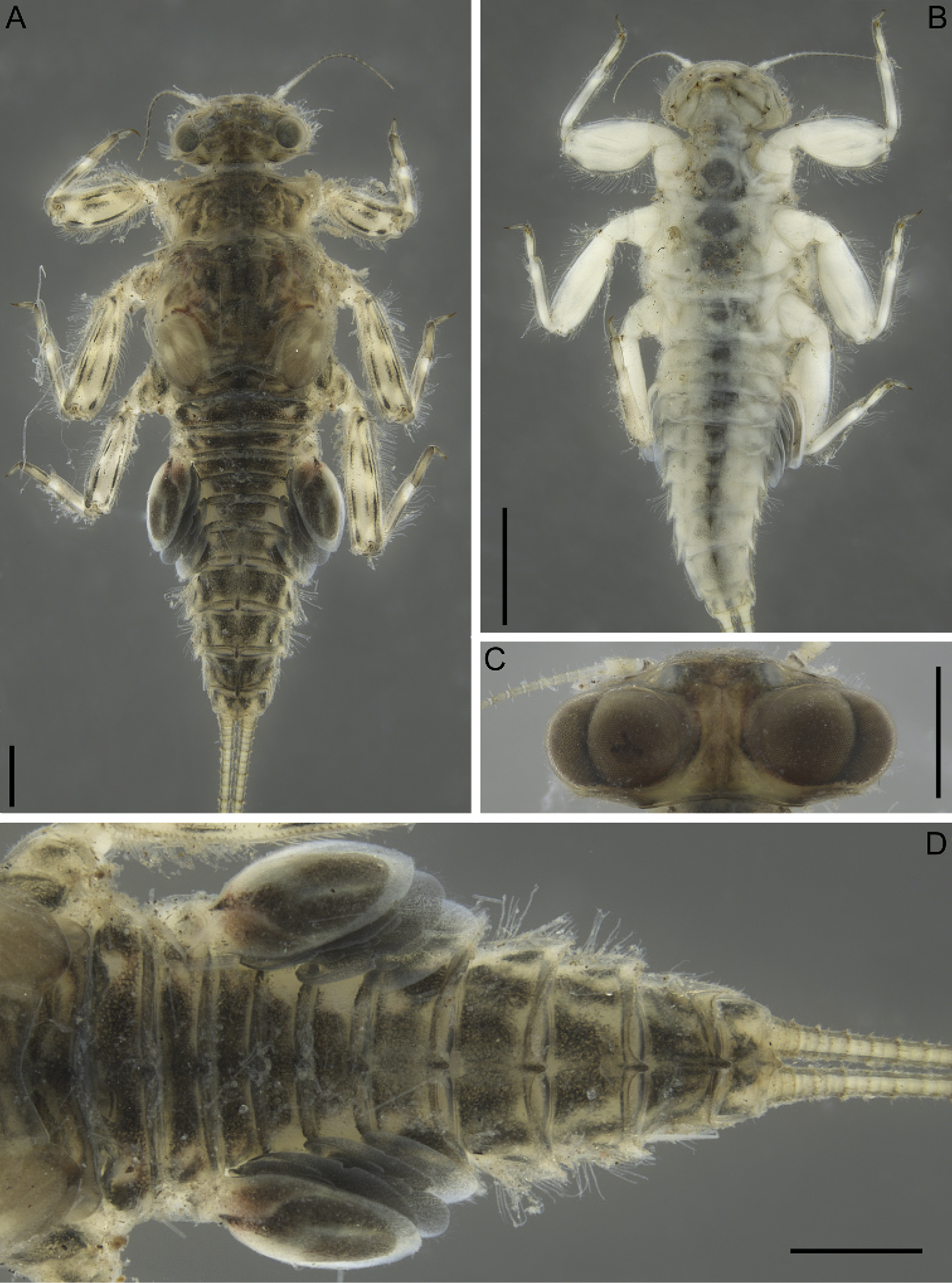
- Adult male (top) and nymph (bottom) of Dudgeodes selvakumari

Scientific classification
- Kingdom: Animalia
- Phylum: Arthropoda
- Clade: Pancrustacea
- Class: Insecta
- Order: Ephemeroptera
- Superfamily: Ephemerelloidea
- Family: Teloganodidae; Allen 1965

Genera
- See text

= Teloganodidae =

Teloganodidae Temporal range: Cenomanian–Recent

Family of mayflies

Teloganodidae is a family of mayflies belonging to Ephemerelloidea, native to the Afrotropical and Oriental realms.

== Genera ==
- Derlethina Sartori, 2008 Southeast Asia
- Dudgeodes Sartori, 2008 Indian subcontinent, Southeast Asia
- Ephemerellina Lestage, 1924 South Africa
- Lestagella Demoulin, 1970 South Africa
- Lithogloea Barnard, 1932 Southern Africa
- Manohyphella Allen, 1973 Madagascar
- Nadinetella McCafferty & Wang, 1998 South Africa
- Teloganodes Eaton, 1882 (=Macafertiella Wang, 1996) Indian subcontinent
- Chibiphemera Burmese amber, Myanmar mid-Cretaceous (Cenomanian)
- Bharataganodes Carbonaceous film, India, late Paleocene.
