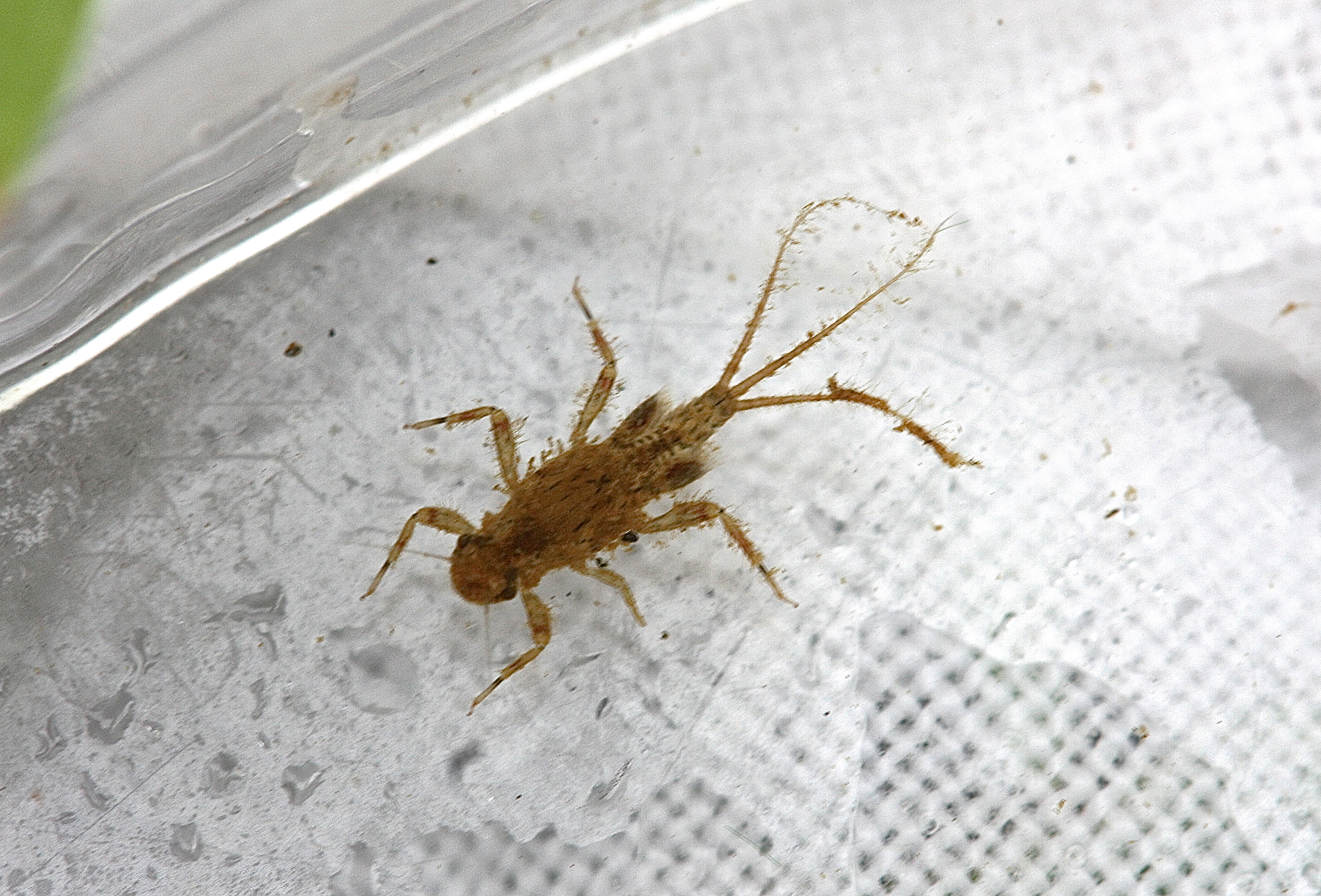
- Mayfly of genus Tricorythodes

Scientific classification
- Domain: Eukaryota
- Kingdom: Animalia
- Phylum: Arthropoda
- Class: Insecta
- Order: Ephemeroptera
- Suborder: Pannota
- Superfamily: Ephemerelloidea
- Family: Leptohyphidae; Landa & Soldán, 1985

Genera
- Amanahyphes; Leptohyphes; Leptohyphodes; Macunahyphes; Traverhyphes; Tricorythodes; Tricorythopsis...

= Leptohyphidae =

Family of mayflies

Leptohyphidae is a family of mayflies with some 140 described species in 12 genera.
