= Wundacaenis =

Scientific classification
- Domain: Eukaryota
- Kingdom: Animalia
- Phylum: Arthropoda
- Class: Insecta
- Order: Ephemeroptera
- Family: Caenidae
- Genus: Wundacaenis; Suter, 1993

Genus of mayflies

Wundacaenis is a genus of small squaregilled mayflies in the family Caenidae. There are at least three described species in Wundacaenis.

== Species ==
These three species belong to the genus Wundacaenis:

- Wundacaenis angulata Suter, 1993
- Wundacaenis dostini Suter, 1993
- Wundacaenis flabellum Suter, 1993
