= Neuville-sur-Ailette =

- Commune
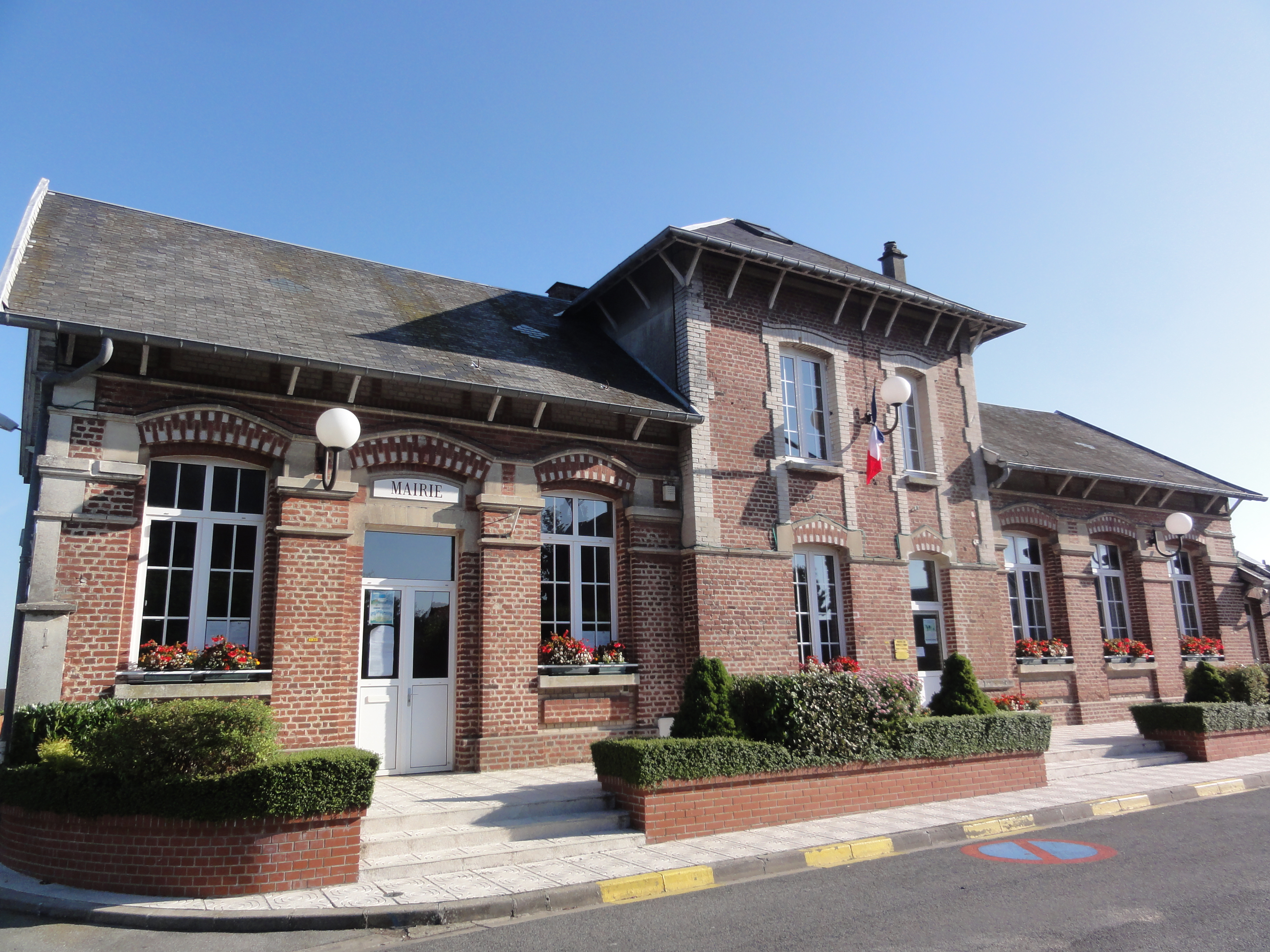
- The town hall of Neuville-Saint-Amand
- Location of Neuville-sur-Ailette
- Location within France Location within Hauts-de-France
- Coordinates: 49°28′06″N 3°42′01″E
- Country: France
- Region: Hauts-de-France
- Department: Aisne
- Arrondissement: Laon
- Canton: Villeneuve-sur-Aisne
- Intercommunality: Chemin des Dames

Government
  - Mayor (2026–32): Claude Collange
- Area^{1}: 4.45 km^{2} (1.72 sq mi)
- Elevation: 87 m (285 ft)
- Highest elevation: 178 m (584 ft)
- Lowest elevation: 77 m (253 ft)
- Population (2023): 121
  - Density: 27.2/km^{2} (70.4/sq mi)
- Time zone: UTC+01:00 (CET)
  - Summer (DST): UTC+02:00 (CEST)
- INSEE/Postal code: 02550 /02860
- ^{1} French Land Register data, which excludes lakes, ponds, glaciers > 1 km^{2} (0.386 sq mi or 247 acres) and river estuaries.

Neuville-sur-Ailette (French pronunciation: [nøvil syʁ ɛlɛt]) is a commune in the Aisne department in Hauts-de-France in northern France.

== Geography ==
The lac de l'Ailette forms part of the commune's southern border.

== Population ==
Historical population
| Year | Pop. | ±% p.a. |
|---|---|---|
| 1968 | 79 | — |
| 1975 | 74 | −0.93% |
| 1982 | 86 | +2.17% |
| 1990 | 71 | −2.37% |
| 1999 | 78 | +1.05% |
| 2007 | 77 | −0.16% |
| 2012 | 102 | +5.78% |
| 2017 | 105 | +0.58% |
| 2023 | 121 | +2.39% |
Source: INSEE

== See also ==
- Communes of the Aisne department
