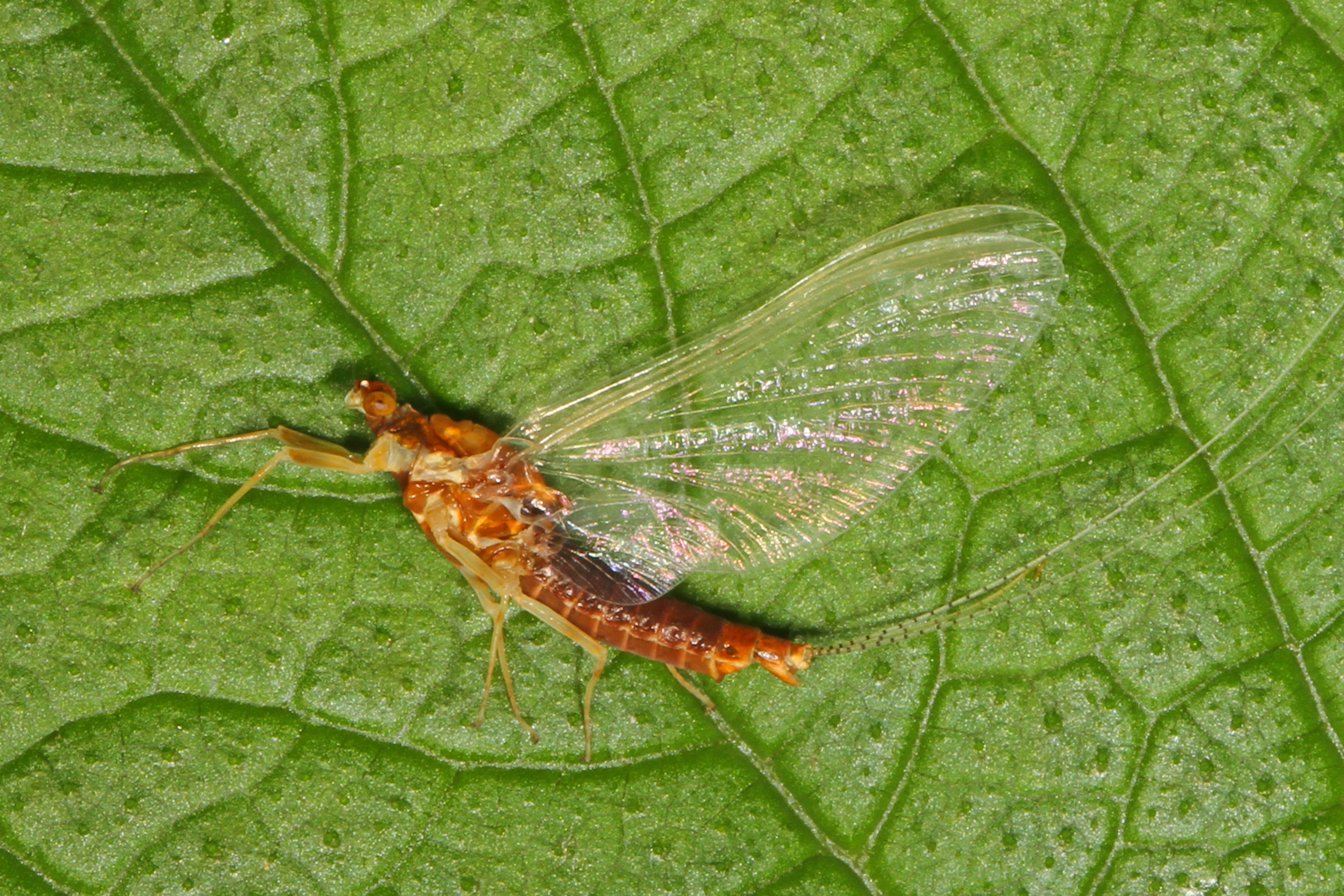
- Eurylophella sp.

Scientific classification
- Kingdom: Animalia
- Phylum: Arthropoda
- Clade: Pancrustacea
- Class: Insecta
- Order: Ephemeroptera
- Suborder: Pannota
- Superfamily: Ephemerelloidea

= Ephemerelloidea =

Superfamily of mayflies

Ephemerelloidea is a superfamily of mayflies in the suborder Pannota. It is a basal group of mayflies with a worldwide distribution. Members of this super-family can be distinguished from those of Caenoidea by the fact that the gills of the nymphs are not filamentous.

The following families are recognised:

- Ephemerellidae
- Leptohyphidae
- Tricorythidae
