= Lac de l'Ailette =

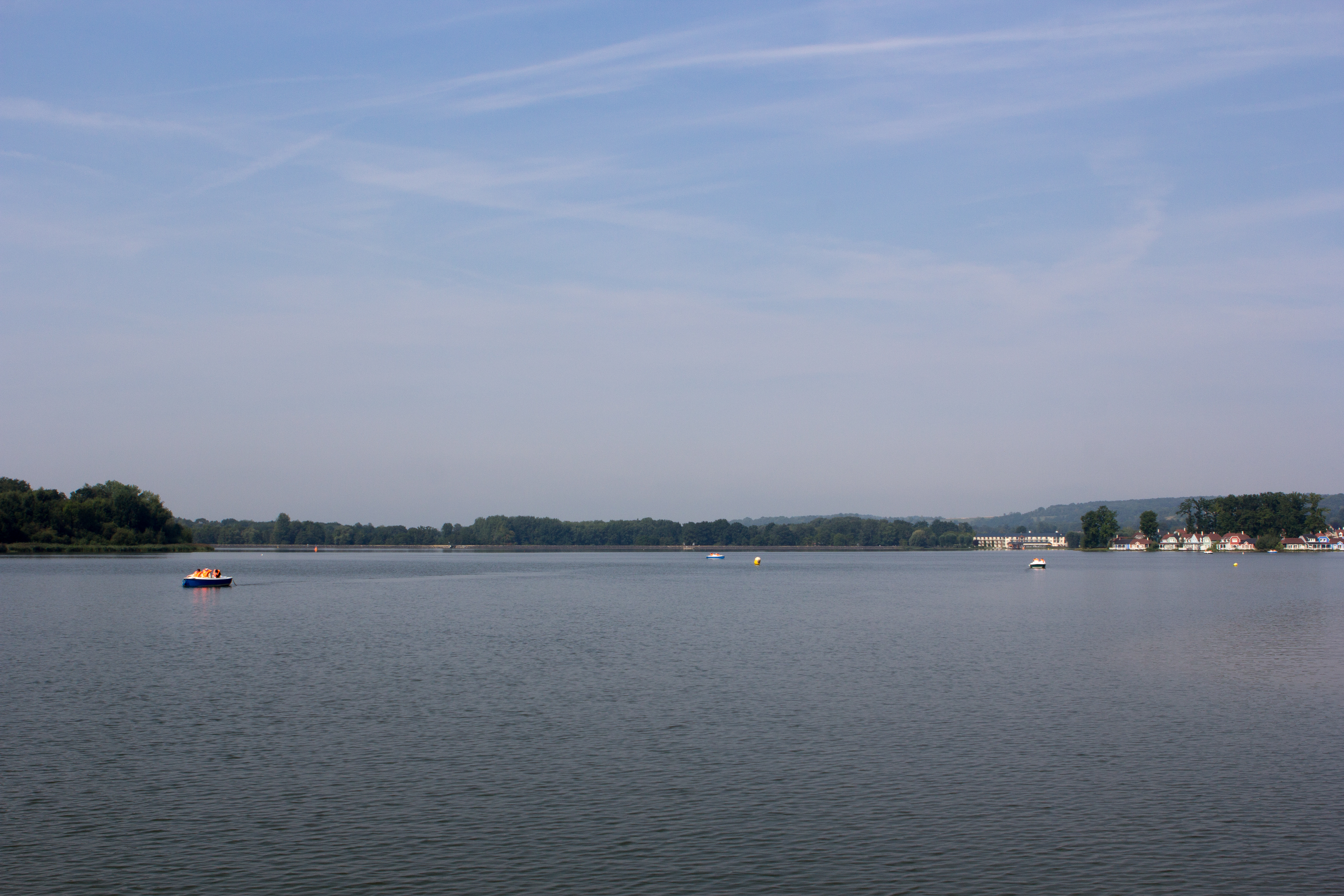
- The lac de l'Ailette and the neighbouring Center Parcs village

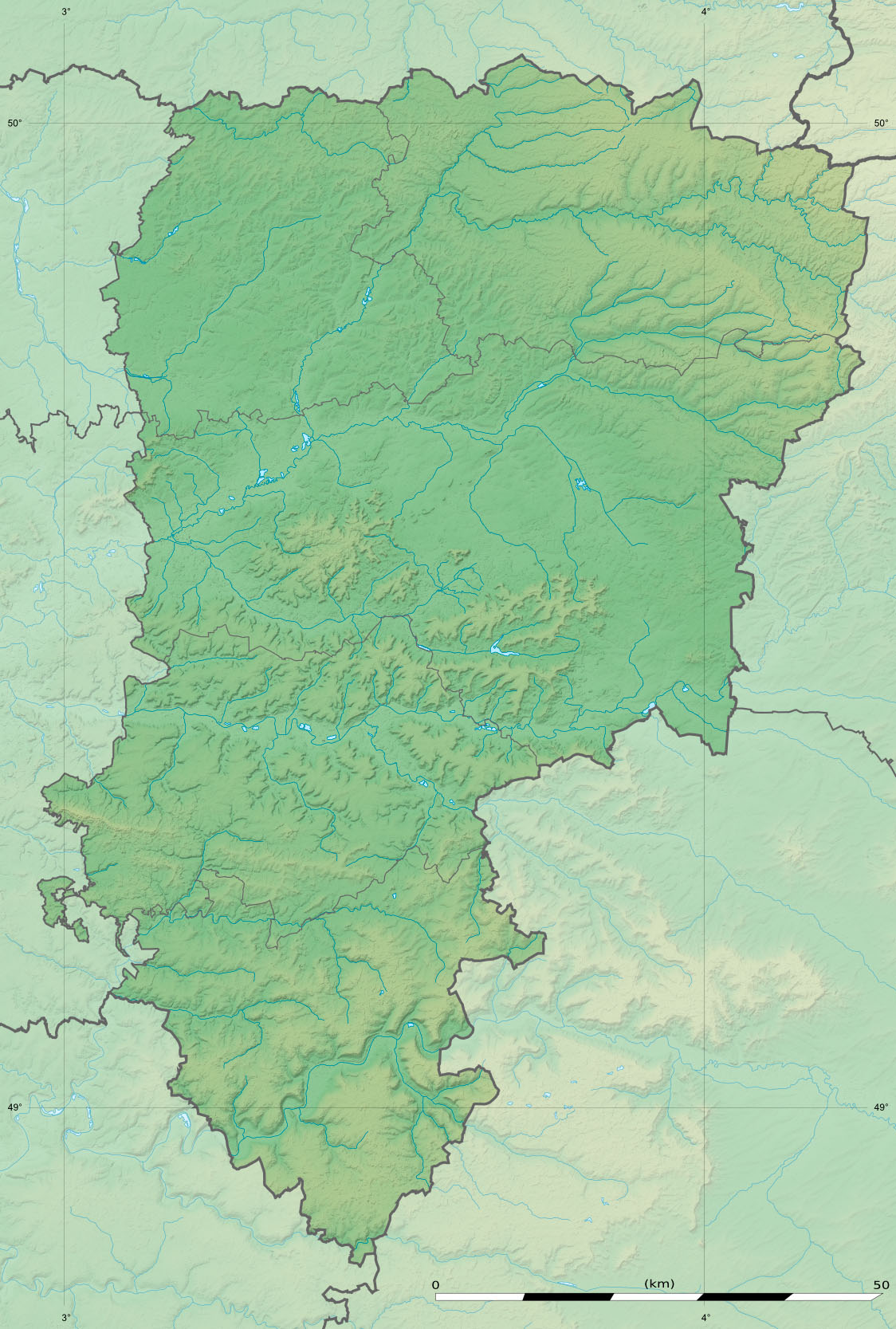
- Location within Aisne
- Location: Aisne, Hauts-de-France
- Coordinates: 49°27′54″N 3°40′22″E
- Type: reservoir
- Primary inflows: Ailette
- Primary outflows: Ailette
- Basin countries: France
- Surface area: 1.60 km^{2} (0.62 sq mi)
- Surface elevation: 80 m (260 ft)

The lac de l'Ailette, or lac d'Ailette, is an artificial lake in the Aisne department in northern France.

== Geography ==
The lac de l'Ailette is an agricultural dam on the territories of Chamouille and Neuville-sur-Ailette, about 11 km away from Laon and 36 km away from Reims. It is located at the confluence of the Bièvre and Ailette valleys.

The lake lies on the course of the Ailette river, a subsidiary of the Oise river.

== History ==
The lake was put into service on October 15, 1983, and reached its maximum theoretical level on February 5, 1984. It was built as a part of a department leisure park for it enabled regional authorities to avoid building smaller lakes or facilities.

== Tourism ==
The lake is located on the GR 142.

Center Parcs' Le Lac d'Ailette residence is located on the side of the lake.

== Environment and fauna ==
20 ha of marsh, 200 ha of coppicing and 100 of barren vegetation and meadows disappeared due to the implementation of the lake. Yet the site hosts numerous bird species. In December 1987, 107 Aves-class animals were censed. This number rose to 116 as of December 1988. More recently, between February 1999 and February 2007, Daniel Baverel identified 177 species on the site; this analysis showed that 207 bird species have ever been present on site, including 76 nesting birds. Also, the lake hosts several species that are rare in Picardy, including Najas marina, Groenlandia densa, claspingleaf pondweed, northern pike, Caenis lactea and emerald damselfly.

The lac de l'Ailette is protected as a natural zone of ecological interest, fauna and flora.
