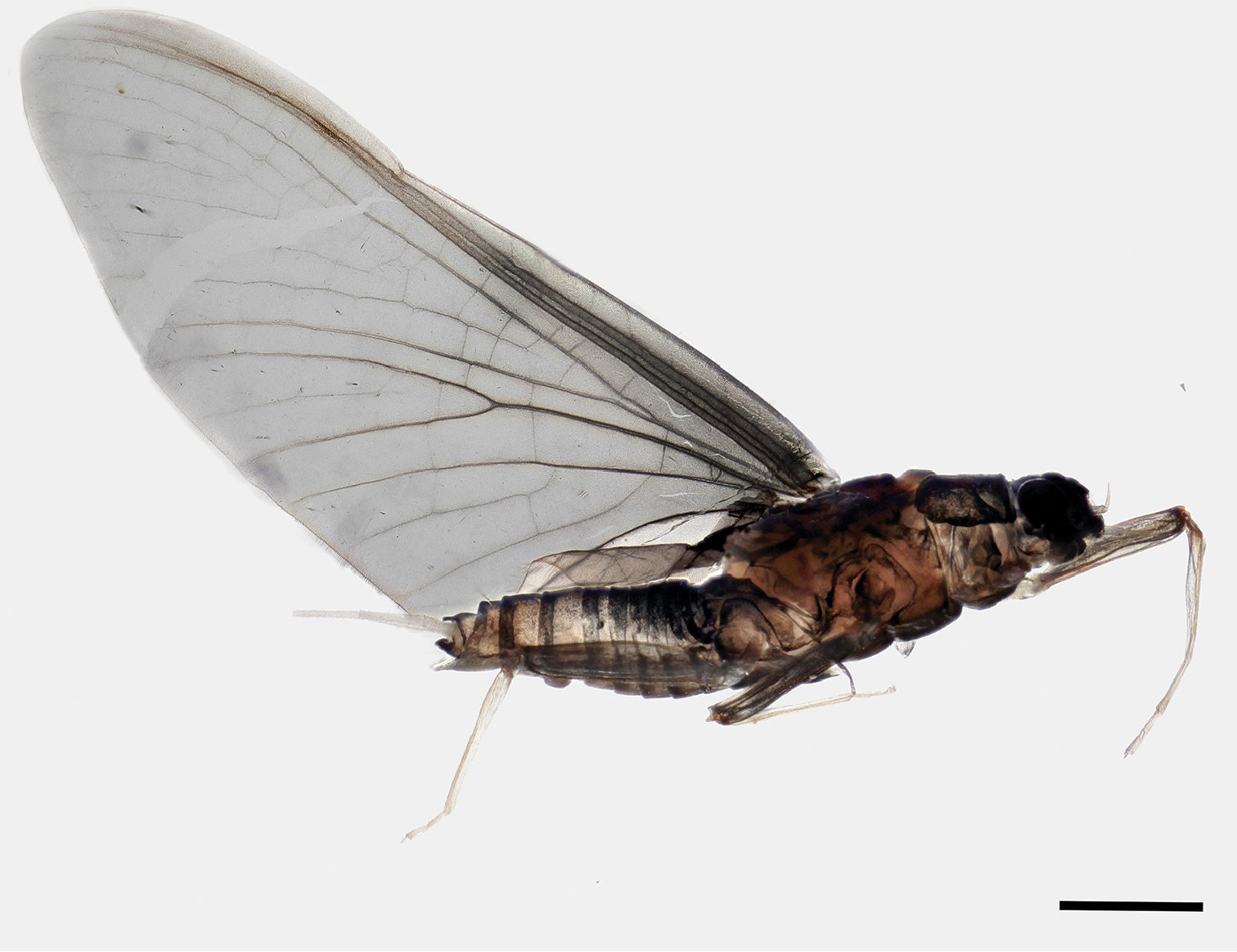

Scientific classification
- Domain: Eukaryota
- Kingdom: Animalia
- Phylum: Arthropoda
- Class: Insecta
- Order: Ephemeroptera
- Family: Tricorythidae

= Tricorythidae =

Family of mayflies

Tricorythidae is a family of mayflies in the order Ephemeroptera. There are about six genera and at least 40 described species in Tricorythidae.

== Genera ==
These six genera belong to the family Tricorythidae:

- Madecassorythus Elouard & Oliarinony, 1997
- Ranorythus Oliarinony & Elouard, 1997
- Sparsorythus Sroka & Soldán, 2008
- Spinirythus Oliarinony & Elouard, 1998
- Tricorythis
- Tricorythus Eaton, 1868
