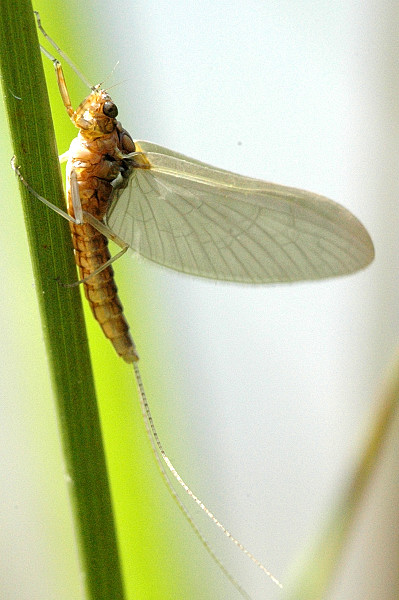

Scientific classification
- Kingdom: Animalia
- Phylum: Arthropoda
- Class: Insecta
- Order: Ephemeroptera
- Family: Caenidae
- Genus: Caenis
- Species: C. horaria

Binomial name
- Caenis horaria (Linnaeus, 1758)

= Caenis horaria =

Species of insect

Caenis horaria is a species of mayfly in the genus Caenis.
