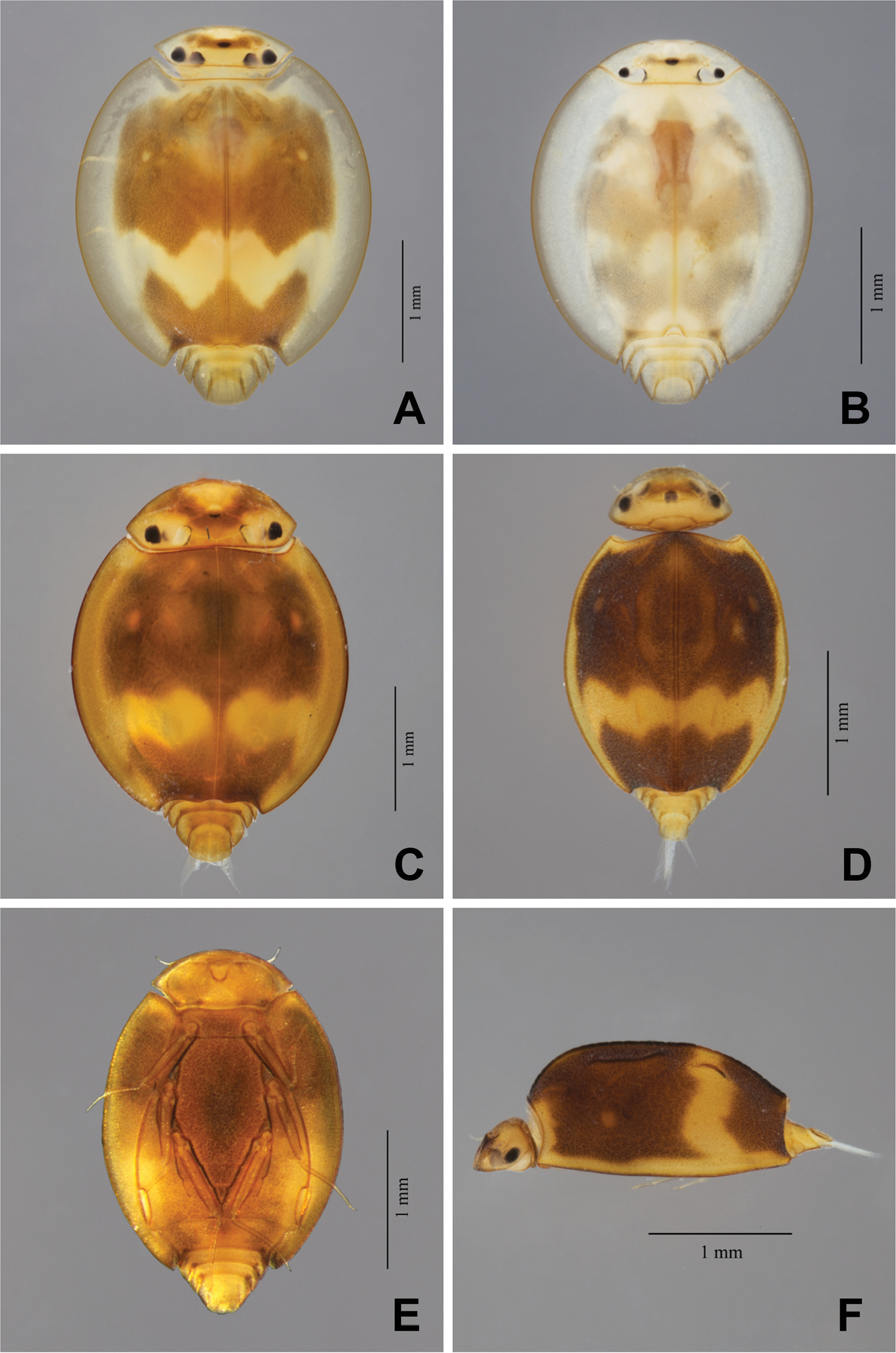
- Prosopistoma larvae
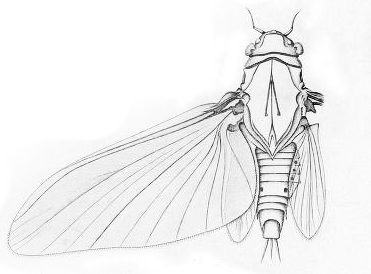
- Prosopistoma female subimago (which appears to the mature female adult stage of this genus)

Scientific classification
- Domain: Eukaryota
- Kingdom: Animalia
- Phylum: Arthropoda
- Class: Insecta
- Order: Ephemeroptera
- Family: Prosopistomatidae; Lameere 1917

Genera
- See text

= Prosopistomatidae =

Prosopistomatidae Temporal range: Cenomanian–Recent

Family of mayflies

Prosopistomatidae is a family of mayflies. There is one extant genus, Prosopistoma, with several dozen species found across Afro-Eurasia and Oceania. They are noted for their unusual beetle-shaped larvae, which live beneath rocks and stones along the gravelly lower reaches of rivers. Their ecology is unclear, but they are probably carnivorous. They are closely related to Baetiscidae, with both families being placed in the Carapacea.

== Genera ==
These two genera belong to the family Prosopistomatidae:

- Prosopistoma Latreille, 1833
- †Proximicorneus Lin et al., 2017 Burmese amber, Myanmar, Late Cretaceous (Cenomanian)
