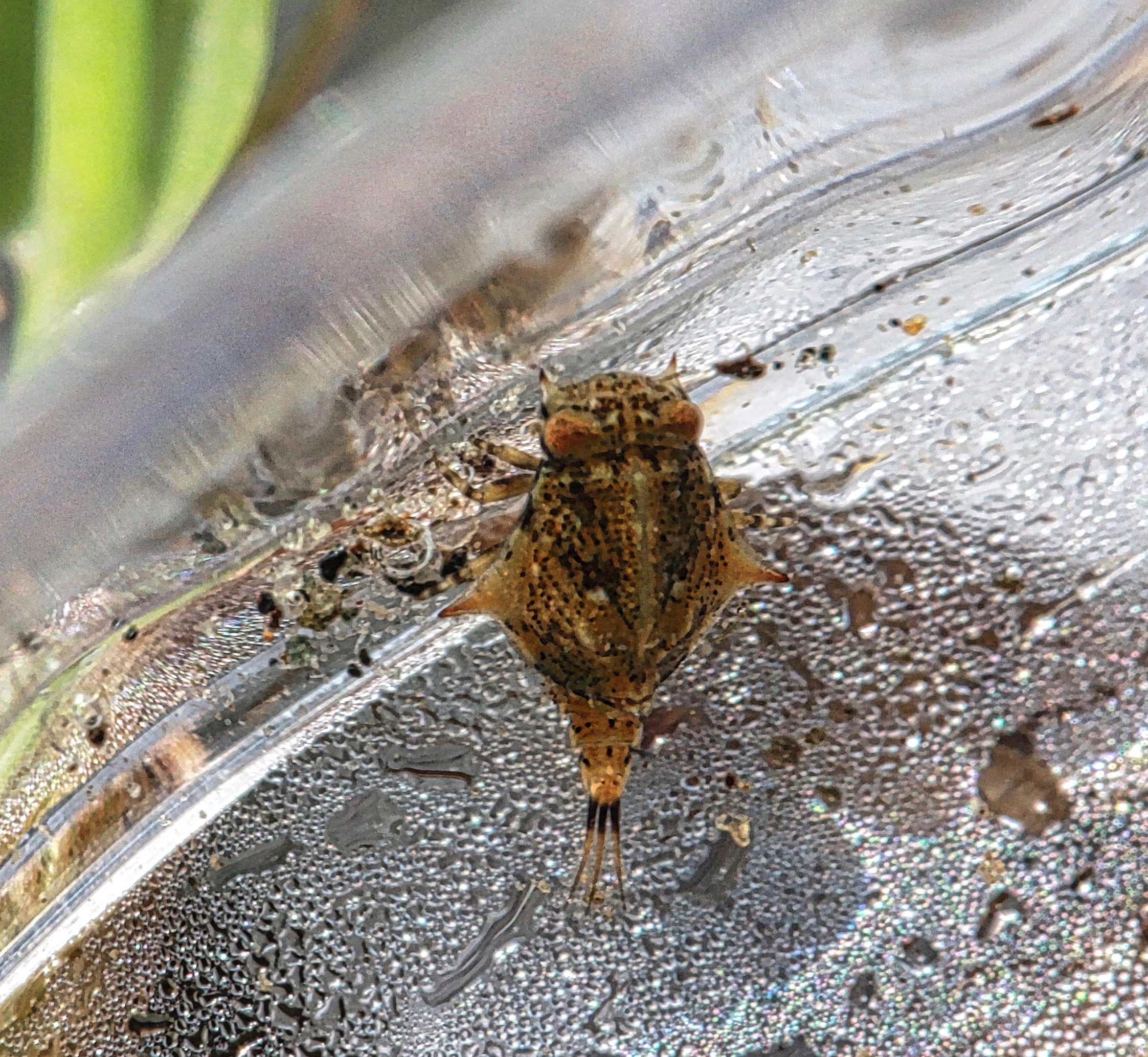
- Baetisca berneri larvae
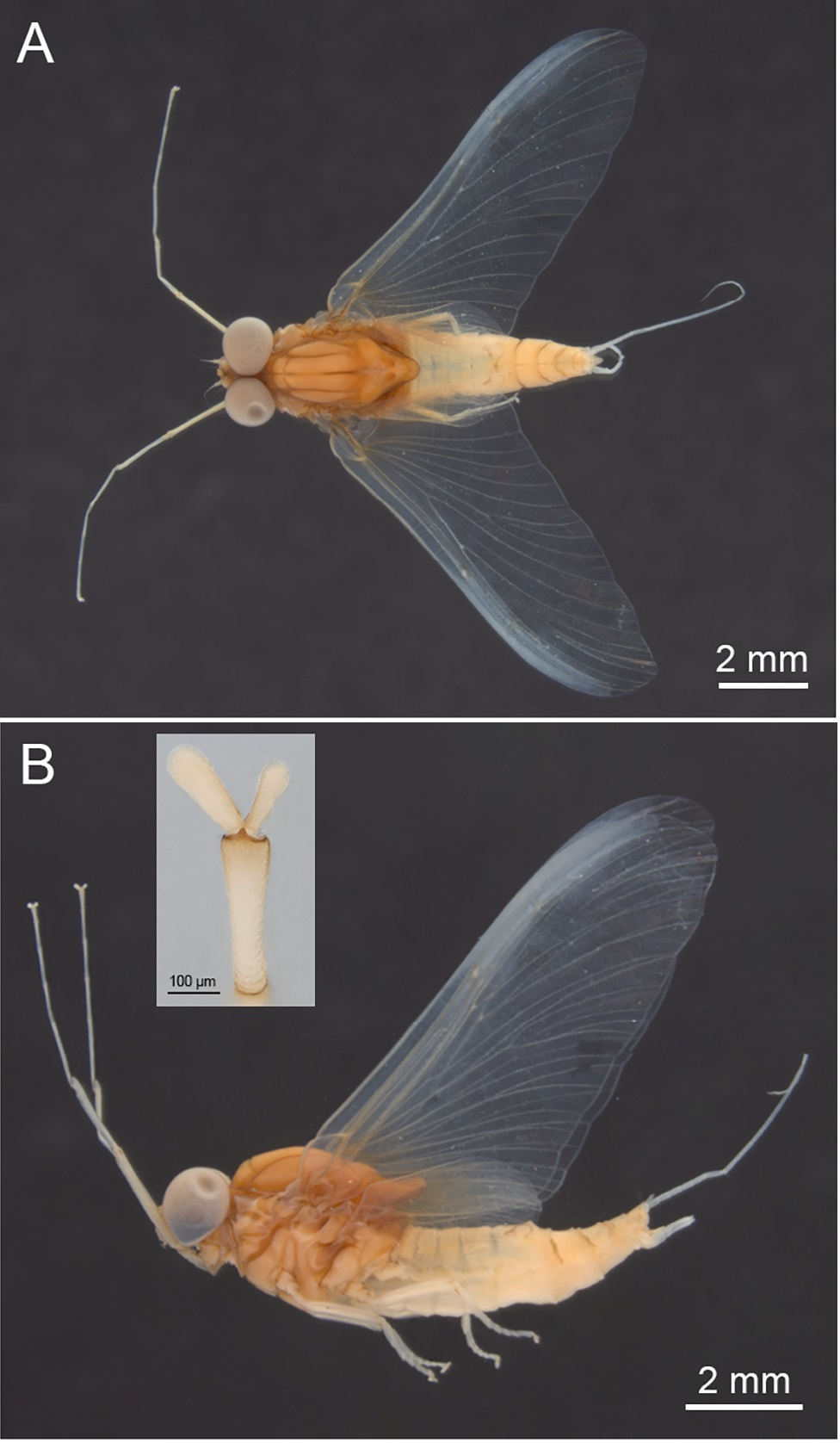
- Baetisca rogersi adult male

Scientific classification
- Kingdom: Animalia
- Phylum: Arthropoda
- Clade: Pancrustacea
- Class: Insecta
- Order: Ephemeroptera
- Suborder: Carapacea
- Family: Baetiscidae; Edmunds and Traver 1954

Genera
- See text

= Baetiscidae =

Baetiscidae Temporal range: Aptian–Recent

Family of mayflies

Baetiscidae is a family of mayflies. It contains a single extant genus, Baetisca, native to North America with around 12 species. The family is noted for their spined armoured larvae, which live in flowing water pools and on the edges of streams where they are detritivores, consuming fine particles of organic matter. Three other extinct genera are known, extending back to the Early Cretaceous, which indicates they once had a broader distribution, also including South America, Europe and Australia. They are closely related to Prosopistomatidae which have unusual, beetle-like nymphs as well as the extinct genus Cretomitarcys, with the three groups constituting the clade Carapacea.

== Taxonomy ==
The family Baetiscidae contains 12 extant species, all in the genus Baetisca, and 6 extinct species in 3 other genera. They were arranged in the phylogenetic splitting sequence as Protobaetisca + (Balticobaetisca + Baetisca)), and later into two subfamilies by Godunko and Sroka in 2024, as such:

- Baetiscinae Godunko & Sroka, 2024
  - Baetisca Walsh, 1862^{i c g b}
  - †Balticobaetisca Staniczek & Bechly, 2002^{g} Baltic amber, Eocene
- Protobaetiscinae Godunko & Sroka, 2024
  - †Protobaetisca Staniczek, 2007 Crato Formation, Brazil, Early Cretaceous (Aptian)
  - †Koonwarrabaetisca Godunko & Sroka, 2024 Koonwarra Fossil Bed, Australia, Early Cretaceous (Aptian).

Data sources: i = ITIS, c = Catalogue of Life, g = GBIF, b = Bugguide.net
