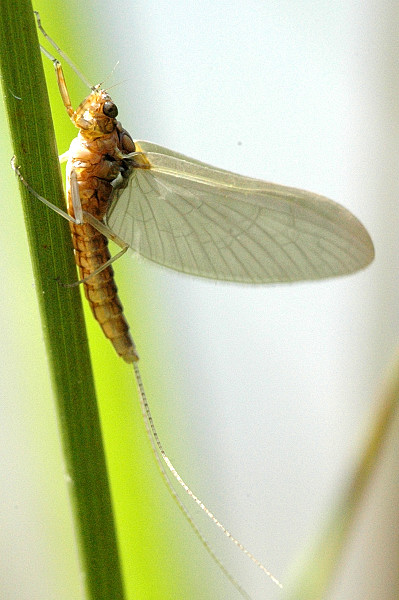
- Caenis horaria

Scientific classification
- Domain: Eukaryota
- Kingdom: Animalia
- Phylum: Arthropoda
- Class: Insecta
- Order: Ephemeroptera
- Suborder: Pannota
- Superfamily: Caenoidea
- Family: Caenidae; Ulmer, 1920

Synonyms
- Brachycercidae, Coenidae

= Caenidae =

Family of mayflies

Caenidae, is a family of mayflies, sometimes called "small squaregill mayflies". Species are found throughout the world in lotic, depositional environments, and they are sprawlers. Caenids occur in quiet and even stagnant water and are often overlooked because they are so small. They like to live in silty bottoms, and their gills are specially adapted for such environments.

== Genera ==
The Global Biodiversity Information Facility includes:

1. Aenigmocaenis Malzacher, 2009
2. Afrocaenis Gillies, 1982
3. Afrocercus Malzacher, 1987
4. Alloretochus Sun & McCafferty, 2008
5. Amercaenis Provonsha & McCafferty, 1985
6. Barnardara McCafferty & Provonsha, 1995
7. Brachycercus Curtis, 1834
8. Brasilocaenis Puthz, 1975
9. Caenis Stephens, 1835
10. Caenoculis Soldán, 1986
11. Caenopsella Gillies, 1977
12. Callistellina Sun & McCafferty, 2004
13. Callistina Sun & McCafferty, 2002
14. Cercobrachys Soldán, 1986
15. Clypeocaenis Soldan, 1978
16. Insulibrachys Soldán, 1986
17. Irpacaenis Suter, 1999
18. Kalimaenis Malzacher, 2013
19. Latineosus Sun & McCafferty, 2008
20. Madecocercus Malzacher, 1995
21. Niandancus Malzacher, 2009
22. Oriobrachys Sun & McCafferty, 2008
23. Provonshara Malzacher, 2014
24. Sparbarus Sun & McCafferty, 2008
25. Susperatus Sun & McCafferty, 2008
26. Tasmanocoenis Lestage, 1930
27. Tigrocercus Malzacher, 2006
28. Tillyardocaenis Kluge, 2004
29. Trichocaenis Malzacher, 2009
30. Wundacaenis Suter, 1993
