= Clarkeophlebia =

Clarkeophlebia argentea

Scientific classification
- Kingdom: Animalia
- Phylum: Arthropoda
- Clade: Pancrustacea
- Class: Insecta
- Order: Lepidoptera
- Family: Cosmopterigidae
- Genus: Clarkeophlebia; Özdikmen, 2005
- Species: C. argentea

Binomial name
- Clarkeophlebia argentea (J.F.G.Clarke, 1986)

Synonyms
- Genus-level: Acanthophlebia J.F.G.Clarke, 1986 (non Towns, 1983: preoccupied); Species-level: Acanthophlebia argentea J.F.G.Clarke, 1986

Genus of moths

Clarkeophlebia is an enigmatic and almost-unknown gelechioid moth genus. It contains a single species, Clarkeophlebia argentea, and is apparently endemic to Fatu Hiva in the Marquesas Islands of Polynesia. It was originally described as Acanthophlebia, but this name had earlier been given to a genus of prong-gilled mayflies.

Its relationships are not well determined. While it is superficially similar to the American concealer moth Fabiola tecta (which is larger and less colorful), in its anatomical details it seems more similar to Adeana leucoxantha (another puzzling Polynesian moth) and/or Asymphorodes. However, it is unique in bearing strange spines of unknown function on the wings, at least in the males.

Clarkeophlebia is tentatively considered a cosmet moth (family Cosmopterigidae) here, but this was thought about Asymphorodes as well; more recently however the latter genus has been assigned to the palm moths of the (somewhat disputed) family Agonoxenidae. This may thus be correct for Clarkeophlebia (and Adeana) too.

== Description ==
C. argentea is a tiny "micromoth" with a generally hairless and smooth body and a wingspan of only 5 mm in the only known specimen (a male). It is, however, rather colorful and boldly marked by gelechioid moth standards. In its overall coloration it is blackish, with some bright and metallic marks; in the holotype, the underside of each hindwing bears a peculiar spine near the base, and there is a smaller spine at the trailing edge of each forewing; the function of these spines is unknown and they are possibly absent in females. The hindwing spines are large enough to be discernible with a high-quality magnifying glass already, despite the moth's diminutive size.

The medium grey head is covered with a smooth layer of scales and bears a well-developed and very scaly proboscis; ocelli are absent, and a white stripe runs along the side of the head. The labial palps are slim and curve backwards; they reach far beyond the vertex in length, with the third segment being somewhat longer than the second. The latter is grey like the head on the outside, with a white spot near the tip, and silvery towards the midline; the third palp segment is black and bears a white lengthwise stripe. Its black serrated antennae have grey rings and bear fine hairs, with a comb of short hairs on the scape as is typical for cosmet moths and some relatives; the scape is shorter than the head. The body is smooth, with a black abdomen and a brassy thorax; the tegula is likewise brassy. Near the junction of the thorax' tergites and pleura, there is a silver lengthwise line on each side. The 8th sternite is slightly modified in shape. The legs are glossy, with the fore- and midlegs a smooth and shiny grey except for the black tarsi; the first two tarsus segments are white-tipped. The hindlegs are metallic black, the scaly tibia has a white spot at midpoint and another one at the tip, and two white spots on the tarsi.

The straight-margined forewings are fringed with thort hairs and otherwise smooth, lance-shaped and pointed, with an almost straight leading and an oblique outer edge, and have 11 veins. Of these, lb is simple at the base and ends in a broad and shallow pit from which rises a short stout spine. C. argentea has a vein 1c, and vein 2 runs from the angle of the forewing cell. Veins 3 and 4 run close to the preceding, and are coincident; vein 5 is vestigial. Veins 6 and 7 share a common stalk; the latter runs to the costa and from the stalk veins 8 and 9 also arise. Vein 11 arises slightly beyond the middle of the cell, and vein 10 runs closer to it than to vein 9. The hindwings are likewise narrow, with a hairy fringe, and have an open cell and very much reduced veins; only veins 6 and 7 are clearly discernible, while vein 3 and/or 4 seem to be present (though reduced) too. Vein 6 and 7 arise from a stalk and the latter runs to the wingtip. The aforementioned long spines are located near the underside at the base of each hindwing.

The forewing color is mainly black with 4 metallic stripes of silvery-blue or -violet, 2 in each main direction: the first runs along the proximal fourth of the leading edge, the second from the wingbase and almost parallel to the first, extending into the cell for about one-third of the total wing length. The third and fourth silver stripe run from the leading to the trailing edge of the forewing, one through the center of the wing and the last at the outer wing's fourth. Between the first two silver stripes there is an oval patch of brassy scales, separated from the silver by the black background color. The hairy fringe shades from black at the termen to grey at the wingtip. The hindwings are dull reddish-brown and unmarked, with a paler fringe.

The male genitalia of C. argentea are asymmetrical and lack socius and uncus. The clasper's harpe is broad at the base, with a short and barely constrained neck; the cucullus narrows towards the tip, the brachia are long and curved and expand tipward, and the tegumen is shorter than wide. The aedeagus has a slender S-shape; the manica bears a high keel on the upperside. The microscopic slide preparation of the holotype's genitals is specimen USNM 25139. The female genitals are of course still unknown.

== Ecology ==
Essentially nothing is known about this species' ecology. The holotype (USNM 100828) was collected on March 11, 1968 at the coastal village of Omo'a on Fatu Hiva (10°30′45″S 138°40′56″W). There, the habitat is heavily influenced by human activity, and includes plants such as Artocarpus species, Papaya (Carica papaya), Coconut (Cocos nucifera), Sea Hibiscus (Hibiscus tiliaceus), Indian Mango (Mangifera indica), Musa (bananas), Thatch Screwpine (Pandanus tectorius), the paspalum grass Paspalum paniculatum, Apple Guava (Psidium guajava), Tamarind (Tamarindus indica), Portia Tree (Thespesia populnea), as well as Cyperaceae sedges, lichens and mosses. It is unlikely, however, that these moths use the non-native species as foodplants, and the only known specimen may have been a vagrant from less disturbed habitat higher up Omo'a Valley. There, native plants such as Bidens henryi, Cheirodendron bastardianum, Pandanus, and East Polynesian Blueberry (Vaccinium cereum) are still more plentiful, and it may be that the species' larval foodplants are found among these.
