= Cystidicoloides tenuissima =

Scientific classification
- Kingdom: Animalia
- Phylum: Nematoda
- Class: Chromadorea
- Order: Rhabditida
- Family: Cystidicolidae
- Genus: Cystidicoloides
- Species: C. tenuissima

Binomial name
- Cystidicoloides tenuissima (Zeder, 1800)

Synonyms
- Fuscaria tenuissima Ruprecht

Species of roundworm

Cystidicoloides tenuissima is a species of nematodes in the order Spirurida and family Cystidicolidae. It is a parasite of salmonid fish (salmon, trout and their allies) in the northern hemisphere and has mayflies as the alternate host.

== Ecology ==
Adult Cystidicoloides tenuissima are found in the stomachs of salmonid fish. The fish, mostly trout and juvenile salmon, acquire the worms by feeding on infected mayflies which are the alternate hosts of the parasite. In the River Swincombe in England, the only mayfly in which the parasite develops is the sepia dun (Leptophlebia marginata). In Czechoslovakia, nymphs of Ephemera danica, Habrophlebia lauta and Habrophlebiodes modesta were found to be capable of transmitting infection, and the larvae were found to be able to survive into the winged adult mayfly stage. When the stone loach (Barbatula barbatula), a fish in the family Balitoridae, was experimentally infected, the nematodes did not develop beyond the fourth larval stage.

C. tenuissima is an annual parasite of fish, with the maturation of the nematode being correlated with the temperature of the water. Adult worms lay eggs in summer and autumn and these pass out of the fish. The eggs form part of the diet of many aqueous invertebrates but it is only when they are eaten by developing nymphs of mayflies that they can continue their life cycle. The juvenile worms live in the body cavities of the nymphs which soon become infective to fish. Fish feed relatively little on early-stage mayfly nymphs during the summer but increasingly consume them as the nymphs grow larger in autumn and winter. Peak incidence of parasitism in fish is in the spring; thereafter the incidence rapidly falls, this being the period when the adult nematodes lay eggs, after which the worms die.
