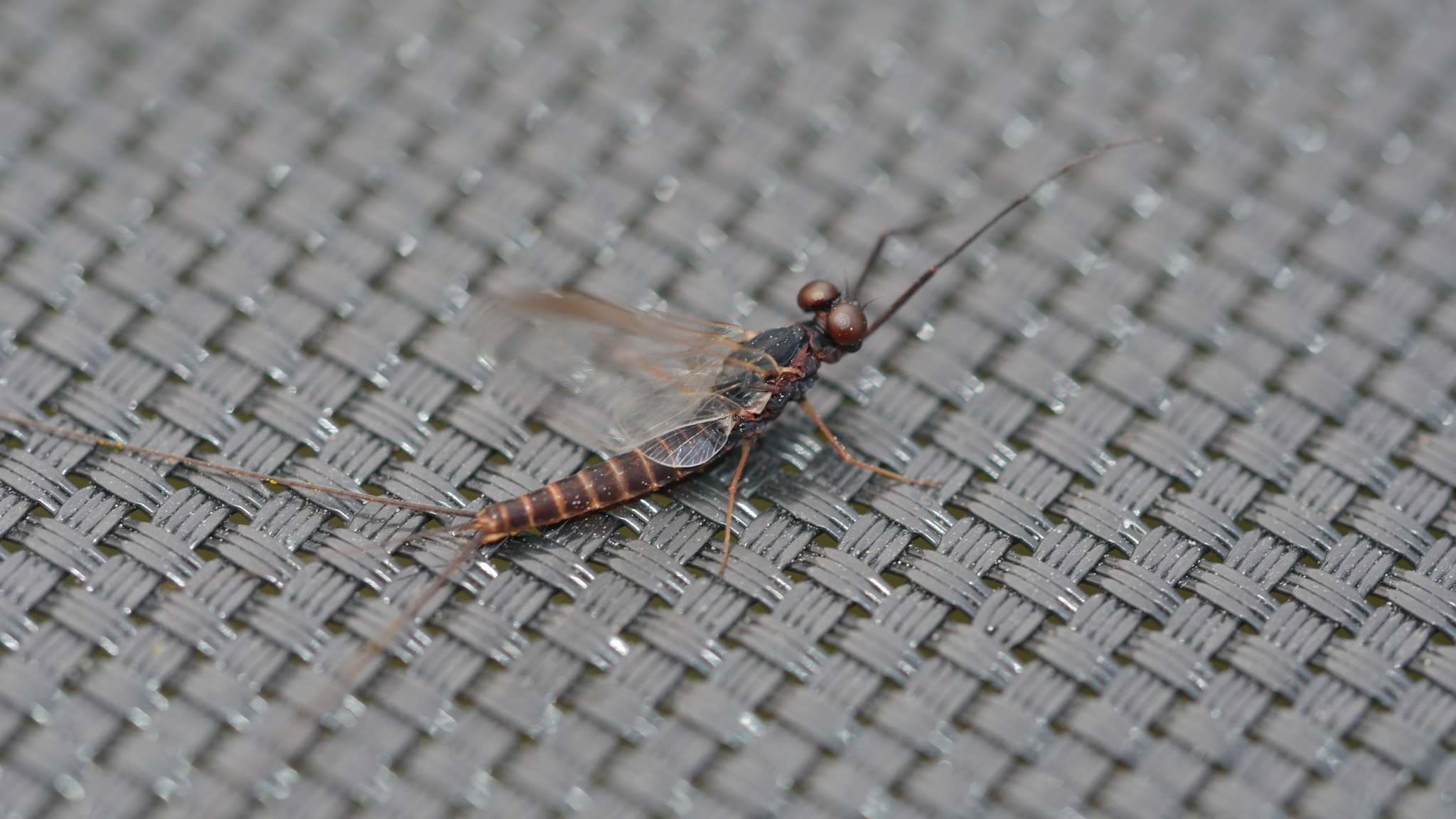

Scientific classification
- Domain: Eukaryota
- Kingdom: Animalia
- Phylum: Arthropoda
- Class: Insecta
- Order: Ephemeroptera
- Family: Leptophlebiidae
- Genus: Leptophlebia
- Species: L. cupida

Binomial name
- Leptophlebia cupida (Say, 1823)

Synonyms
- Baetis ignava (Traver, 1932); Blasturus austrinus Traver, 1932; Blasturus collinus (Traver, 1932); Blasturus concinnus (Walker, 1853); Blasturus gravastellus (Walker, 1853); Cloe quebecensis (Hagen, 1861); Ephemera cupida Say, 1823; Ephemera hebes Walker, 1853; Ephemerella quebecensis Eaton, 1884; Heptagenia quebecensis (Provancher, 1876); Leptophlebia austrina Hagen, 1861; Leptophlebia collina Traver, 1932; Leptophlebia concinna (Walker, 1853); Leptophlebia gravastella Provancher, 1876; Leptophlebia hebes Say, 1823; Leptophlebia ignava Walker, 1853; Leptophlebia pallipes (Provancher, 1876); Palingenia concinna Walker, 1853; Palingenia pallipes Walker, 1853; Potamanthus concinnus (Walker, 1853)

= Leptophlebia cupida =

Species of mayfly

Leptophlebia cupida, known generally as the early brown spinner or black quill, is a species of pronggilled mayfly in the family Leptophlebiidae. It is found in North America.
