= Paraleptophlebia praepedita =

Scientific classification
- Domain: Eukaryota
- Kingdom: Animalia
- Phylum: Arthropoda
- Class: Insecta
- Order: Ephemeroptera
- Family: Leptophlebiidae
- Genus: Paraleptophlebia
- Species: P. praepedita

Binomial name
- Paraleptophlebia praepedita (Eaton, 1884)

Synonyms
- Leptophlebia praepedita Eaton, 1884

Species of mayfly

Paraleptophlebia praepedita is a species of pronggilled mayfly in the family Leptophlebiidae. It is found in North America.
