= Ephoron leukon =

Scientific classification
- Domain: Eukaryota
- Kingdom: Animalia
- Phylum: Arthropoda
- Class: Insecta
- Order: Ephemeroptera
- Family: Polymitarcyidae
- Genus: Ephoron
- Species: E. leukon

Binomial name
- Ephoron leukon Williamson, 1802

Species of mayfly

Ephoron leukon, the white fly, is a species of pale burrower mayfly in the family Polymitarcyidae. It is found in North America.
