= Paraleptophlebia helena =

Scientific classification
- Domain: Eukaryota
- Kingdom: Animalia
- Phylum: Arthropoda
- Class: Insecta
- Order: Ephemeroptera
- Family: Leptophlebiidae
- Genus: Paraleptophlebia
- Species: P. helena

Binomial name
- Paraleptophlebia helena Day, 1952

Species of mayfly

Paraleptophlebia helena is a species of pronggilled mayfly in the family Leptophlebiidae. It is found in North America.
