= Atalophlebia miunga =

Scientific classification
- Domain: Eukaryota
- Kingdom: Animalia
- Phylum: Arthropoda
- Class: Insecta
- Order: Ephemeroptera
- Family: Leptophlebiidae
- Genus: Atalophlebia
- Species: A. miunga

Binomial name
- Atalophlebia miunga Harker, 1954

Species of mayfly

Atalophlebia miunga is a species of pronggill mayfly in the family Leptophlebiidae.
