= Leptophlebia konza =

Scientific classification
- Domain: Eukaryota
- Kingdom: Animalia
- Phylum: Arthropoda
- Class: Insecta
- Order: Ephemeroptera
- Family: Leptophlebiidae
- Genus: Leptophlebia
- Species: L. konza

Binomial name
- Leptophlebia konza Burian, 2001

Species of mayfly

Leptophlebia konza is a species of pronggill mayfly in the family Leptophlebiidae. It is found in North America.
