= Atalophlebia aurata =

Scientific classification
- Domain: Eukaryota
- Kingdom: Animalia
- Phylum: Arthropoda
- Class: Insecta
- Order: Ephemeroptera
- Family: Leptophlebiidae
- Genus: Atalophlebia
- Species: A. aurata

Binomial name
- Atalophlebia aurata Suter, 1986

Species of mayfly

Atalophlebia aurata is a species of pronggill mayfly in the family Leptophlebiidae.
