= Leptophlebia intermedia =

Scientific classification
- Domain: Eukaryota
- Kingdom: Animalia
- Phylum: Arthropoda
- Class: Insecta
- Order: Ephemeroptera
- Family: Leptophlebiidae
- Genus: Leptophlebia
- Species: L. intermedia

Binomial name
- Leptophlebia intermedia (Traver, 1932)

Synonyms
- Blasturus grandis (Traver, 1932); Blasturus intermedius Traver, 1932; Leptophlebia grandis Traver, 1932

Species of mayfly

Leptophlebia intermedia is a species of pronggilled mayfly in the family Leptophlebiidae. It is found in North America.
