= Leptophlebia johnsoni =

Scientific classification
- Domain: Eukaryota
- Kingdom: Animalia
- Phylum: Arthropoda
- Class: Insecta
- Order: Ephemeroptera
- Family: Leptophlebiidae
- Genus: Leptophlebia
- Species: L. johnsoni

Binomial name
- Leptophlebia johnsoni McDunnough, 1924

Synonyms
- Blasturus gracilis (Traver, 1932); Leptophlebia gracilis Traver, 1932

Species of mayfly

Leptophlebia johnsoni, or Johnson's pronggill mayfly, is a species of pronggilled mayfly in the family Leptophlebiidae. It is found in North America.
