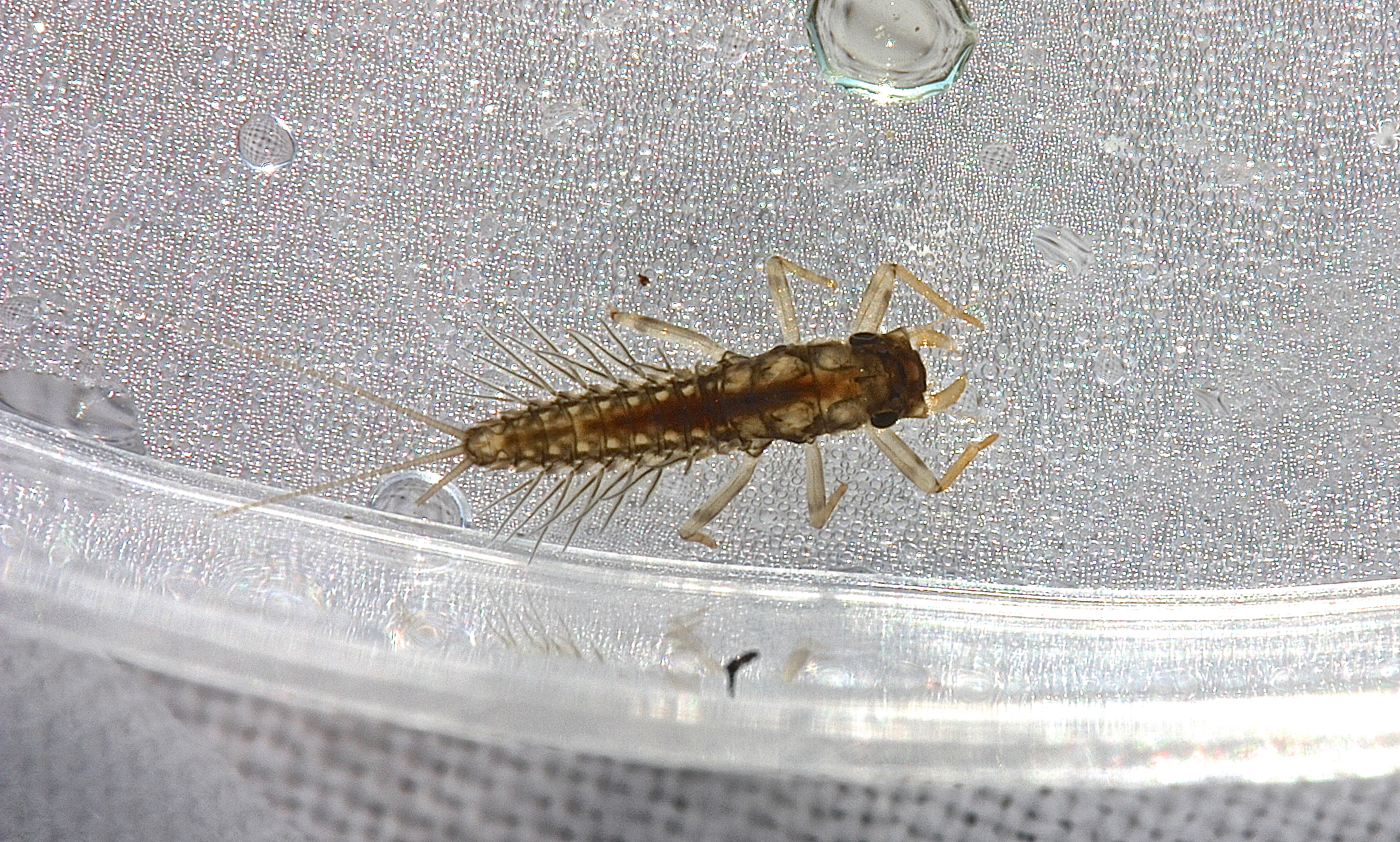

Scientific classification
- Domain: Eukaryota
- Kingdom: Animalia
- Phylum: Arthropoda
- Class: Insecta
- Order: Ephemeroptera
- Family: Leptophlebiidae
- Genus: Paraleptophlebia
- Species: P. bicornuta

Binomial name
- Paraleptophlebia bicornuta (McDunnough, 1926)

Synonyms
- Leptophlebia bicornuta McDunnough, 1926

= Paraleptophlebia bicornuta =

Species of mayfly

Paraleptophlebia bicornuta is a species of pronggilled mayfly in the family Leptophlebiidae. It is found in North America.
