= Paraleptophlebia vaciva =

Scientific classification
- Domain: Eukaryota
- Kingdom: Animalia
- Phylum: Arthropoda
- Class: Insecta
- Order: Ephemeroptera
- Family: Leptophlebiidae
- Genus: Paraleptophlebia
- Species: P. vaciva

Binomial name
- Paraleptophlebia vaciva (Eaton, 1884)

Synonyms
- Leptophlebia vaciva Eaton, 1884

Species of mayfly

Paraleptophlebia vaciva is a species of pronggilled mayfly in the family Leptophlebiidae. It is found in southwestern Canada, the northwestern United States, and Alaska.
