= Habrophlebia vibrans =

Scientific classification
- Domain: Eukaryota
- Kingdom: Animalia
- Phylum: Arthropoda
- Class: Insecta
- Order: Ephemeroptera
- Family: Leptophlebiidae
- Genus: Habrophlebia
- Species: H. vibrans

Binomial name
- Habrophlebia vibrans Needham, 1907

Synonyms
- Habrophlebia jocosa Banks, 1914; Habrophlebia pusilla Traver, 1932

Species of mayfly

Habrophlebia vibrans is a species of pronggilled mayfly in the family Leptophlebiidae. It is found in North America.
