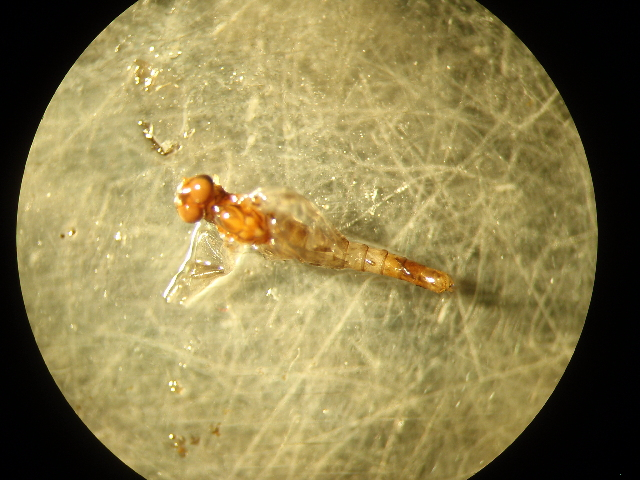

Scientific classification
- Domain: Eukaryota
- Kingdom: Animalia
- Phylum: Arthropoda
- Class: Insecta
- Order: Ephemeroptera
- Family: Leptophlebiidae
- Genus: Paraleptophlebia
- Species: P. guttata

Binomial name
- Paraleptophlebia guttata (McDunnough, 1924)

Synonyms
- Leptophlebia guttata McDunnough, 1924

= Paraleptophlebia guttata =

Species of mayfly

Paraleptophlebia guttata is a species of pronggilled mayfly in the family Leptophlebiidae. It is found in southeastern, northern Canada, and the eastern United States.
