= Leptophlebia wui =

Scientific classification
- Domain: Eukaryota
- Kingdom: Animalia
- Phylum: Arthropoda
- Class: Insecta
- Order: Ephemeroptera
- Family: Leptophlebiidae
- Genus: Leptophlebia
- Species: L. wui

Binomial name
- Leptophlebia wui Ulmer, 1936

Species of mayfly

Leptophlebia wui is a species of pronggill mayfly in the family Leptophlebiidae.
