= Ephoron album =

Scientific classification
- Kingdom: Animalia
- Phylum: Arthropoda
- Class: Insecta
- Order: Ephemeroptera
- Family: Polymitarcyidae
- Genus: Ephoron
- Species: E. album

Binomial name
- Ephoron album (Say, 1824)

Synonyms
- Baetis albus Say, 1824

Species of mayfly

Ephoron album, commonly known as Say's Burrowing White Mayfly, is a species of mayfly in the family Polymitarcyidae. It is native to North America and is widely distributed across the eastern and central United States, particularly in slow-flowing, warm rivers where silt and fine sediment accumulate. The species is notable for its synchronized mass emergences, or “superhatches,” which often occur in late summer and can involve millions of individuals hatching in a single evening.

== Taxonomy and discovery ==
The species was first described in 1823 by American naturalist Thomas Say, who initially classified it as Baetis alba. Say documented the insect during Major Stephen Harriman Long's expedition to the headwaters of the Mississippi River. Accounts from the expedition recorded large swarms of the mayflies along rivers near what is now the border of Minnesota and Canada—possibly one of the earliest written observations of a major mayfly emergence in North America.

Later taxonomic revisions placed the species in the genus Ephoron, with the accepted name Ephoron album reflecting its pale coloration.

== Description ==
Ephoron album adults are distinguished by their pale, milky-white wings and slender, soft-bodied appearance. Males possess long, threadlike tails and prominent turbinate eyes, used to locate females during mating swarms. As with other mayflies, adults do not feed and live only for a brief period—often less than 24 hours—after emerging.

Nymphs are burrowers, adapted to live in silty or muddy riverbeds. They possess tusk-like mandibles for digging and feed on detritus and microscopic organic material filtered from the substrate.

== Life cycle ==
Like all mayflies, Ephoron album undergoes incomplete metamorphosis with three main stages: egg, nymph, and adult. After hatching from eggs laid in rivers, the nymphs burrow into soft sediment and remain there for most of their lives, which can span several months to a year depending on water temperature and other environmental conditions.

In late summer, mature nymphs rise to the surface to molt into a subimago (a winged, but sexually immature stage), then shortly afterward molt again into a fully mature imago. Emergence typically occurs at dusk and is highly synchronized across large populations, forming vast clouds of insects that mate in flight before dying en masse—a phenomenon that often draws attention from anglers, naturalists, and local residents.

== Ecological and angling significance ==
The brief but spectacular emergence of Ephoron album plays an important ecological role, providing a temporary but massive food source for fish, birds, and other aquatic and terrestrial predators. In some river systems, trout and other fish species feed aggressively on the mayflies during these hatches, making the species a valuable target for fly fishers.

Fly patterns imitating Ephoron album, often referred to simply as “White Flies,” are used during evening fishing sessions in late July and August, particularly in rivers such as the Susquehanna, Mississippi, and Whitewater systems.

== Distribution and habitat ==
Ephoron album is found across much of the eastern and midwestern United States, from the Mississippi River basin to the Atlantic coastal plain. It prefers warm, turbid, slow-moving rivers and streams with fine sediments suitable for burrowing.
