= Atalophlebia marowana =

Scientific classification
- Domain: Eukaryota
- Kingdom: Animalia
- Phylum: Arthropoda
- Class: Insecta
- Order: Ephemeroptera
- Family: Leptophlebiidae
- Genus: Atalophlebia
- Species: A. marowana

Binomial name
- Atalophlebia marowana Harker, 1950

Species of mayfly

Atalophlebia marowana is a species of pronggill mayfly in the family Leptophlebiidae.
