= Paraleptophlebia debilis =

Scientific classification
- Domain: Eukaryota
- Kingdom: Animalia
- Phylum: Arthropoda
- Class: Insecta
- Order: Ephemeroptera
- Family: Leptophlebiidae
- Genus: Paraleptophlebia
- Species: P. debilis

Binomial name
- Paraleptophlebia debilis (Walker, 1853)

Synonyms
- Baetis debilis Walker, 1853

Species of mayfly

Paraleptophlebia debilis, the mahogany dun, is a species of pronggilled mayfly in the family Leptophlebiidae. It is found in North America.
