= Jappa =

Scientific classification
- Domain: Eukaryota
- Kingdom: Animalia
- Phylum: Arthropoda
- Class: Insecta
- Order: Ephemeroptera
- Suborder: Furcatergalia
- Family: Leptophlebiidae
- Genus: Jappa; Harker, 1954

Genus of mayflies

External image
- Images at iNaturalist

Jappa is a genus of eastern and North Australian mayflies in the family Leptophlebiidae, erected by J.E. Harker in 1954.

== Species ==
The following are included in BioLib.cz:

1. Jappa campbelli Bae & Finlay, 2003
2. Jappa edmundsi Skedros & Polhemus, 1986
3. Jappa furcifera (Eaton, 1871)
4. Jappa harkerae Bae & Campbell, 2013
5. Jappa kutera Harker, 1954 - type species
6. Jappa serrata Skedros & Polhemus, 1986
7. Jappa strigata (Eaton, 1871)
8. Jappa suteri Bae & Finlay, 2013
9. Jappa tristis Harker, 1954
