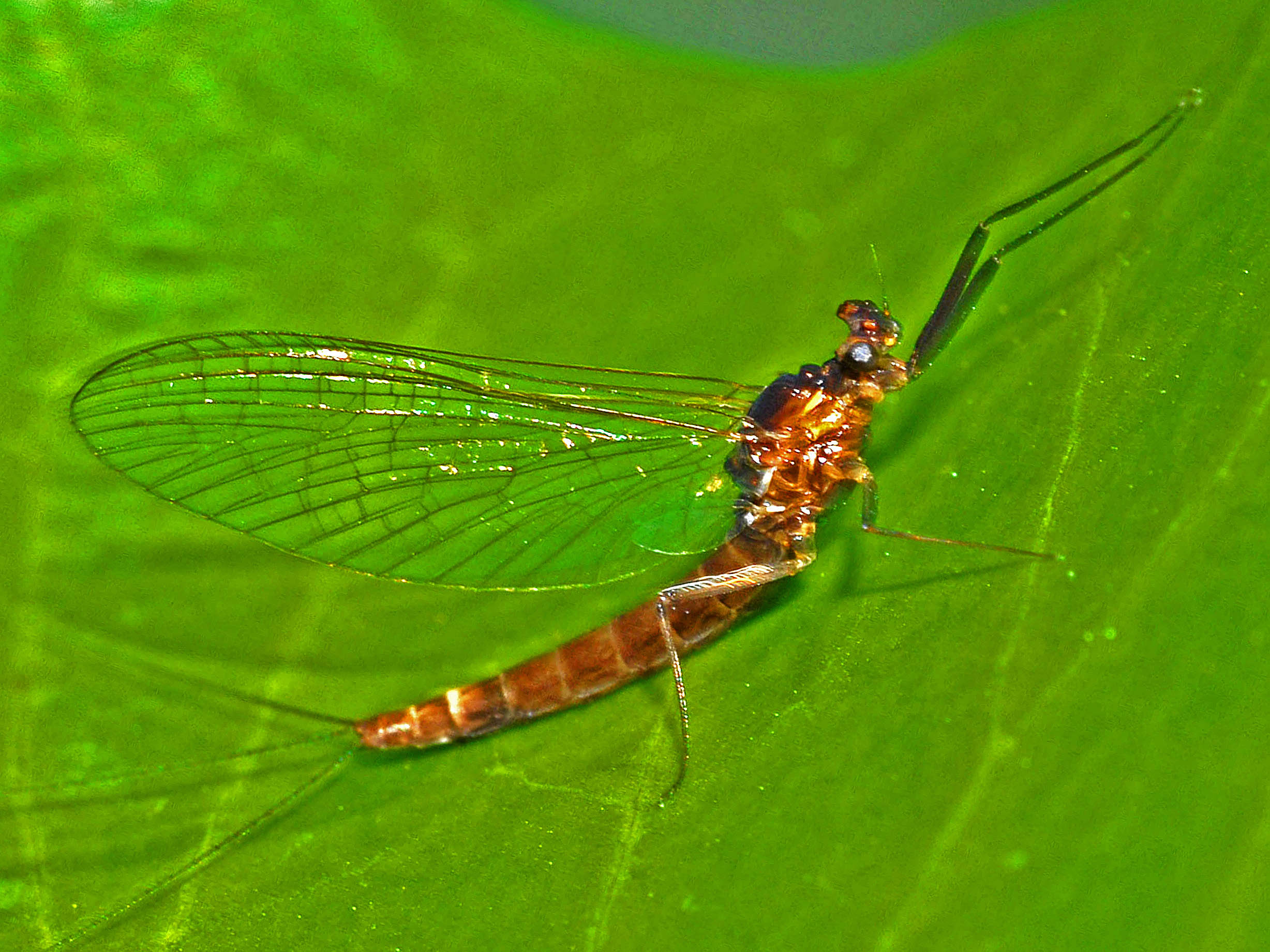
- Female of Paraleptophlebia submarginata

Scientific classification
- Domain: Eukaryota
- Kingdom: Animalia
- Phylum: Arthropoda
- Class: Insecta
- Order: Ephemeroptera
- Family: Leptophlebiidae
- Genus: Paraleptophlebia
- Species: P. submarginata

Binomial name
- Paraleptophlebia submarginata (Stephens, 1835)

Synonyms
- Ephemera submarginata Stephens, 1835

= Paraleptophlebia submarginata =

Species of mayfly

Paraleptophlebia submarginata is a species of prong-gilled mayfly in the family Leptophlebiidae.

== Description ==
Paraleptophlebia submarginata can reach a body length of about 9–12 mm (0.35–0.47 in). These mayflies have a very dark brown body, with a clear darker drawing on the back and transparent wings of about 12–14 mm (0.47–0.55 in), with evident ribs. The front wings are triangular and quite long, while the back wings are much smaller, about a third of the front wings, and rather round in shape. The head is perpendicular to the body axis, with the eyes on the side. At the back of the rear body there are three long cerci, reaching 12–15 mm (0.47–0.59 in) in males, 9–12 mm (0.35–0.47 in) in females. They have short bristles on both sides.

== Distribution and habitat ==
This species is very abundant in the upper and middle rivers and streams with stony ground of most of Europe. It is present in Albania, Andorra, Austria, Belarus, Belgium, Bosnia and Herzegovina, Bulgaria, Croatia, Czech Republic, Denmark, Estonia, Faroe Islands, France, Germany, Gibraltar, Greece, Hungary, Ireland, Isle of Man, Italy, Jersey, Latvia, Liechtenstein, Lithuania, Luxembourg, Macedonia, Malta, Moldova, Montenegro, Netherlands, Norway, Poland, Portugal, Romania, Serbia, Slovakia, Slovenia, Spain, Sweden, Switzerland, Ukraine, United Kingdom.

== Biology and behavior ==
Females of Paraleptophlebia submarginata lay eggs onto the water surface. Eggs sink immediately to the bottom. These mayfly lives most of its life as larvae or nymphs. Larvae usually stay in the moss lawn of stones. They eat small particles of organic matter, such as algae, plant residues or decaying plants. Nymphs show an elongated and round shaped body, reaching a length of about 10–12 mm (0.39–0.47 in). Subimago live about 20 hours, imago up to 3 days. Adults can be found from early April to mid-September. At the rest the wings are held straight up and out of the body. Adults do not feed at all. Males rarely live more than one day.
