= Traverella albertana =

Scientific classification
- Domain: Eukaryota
- Kingdom: Animalia
- Phylum: Arthropoda
- Class: Insecta
- Order: Ephemeroptera
- Family: Leptophlebiidae
- Genus: Traverella
- Species: T. albertana

Binomial name
- Traverella albertana (McDunnough, 1931)

Synonyms
- Thraulus albertanus McDunnough, 1931; Traverella castanea Kilgore and Allen, 1973

Species of mayfly

Traverella albertana is a species of pronggilled mayfly in the family Leptophlebiidae. It is found in Central America and North America.
