= Leptophlebia vespertina =

Scientific classification
- Kingdom: Animalia
- Phylum: Arthropoda
- Class: Insecta
- Order: Ephemeroptera
- Family: Leptophlebiidae
- Genus: Leptophlebia
- Species: L. vespertina

Binomial name
- Leptophlebia vespertina (Linnaeus, 1758)

Synonyms
- Ephemera vespertina Linnaeus, 1758; Leptophlebia meyeri Eaton, 1884

Species of mayfly

Leptophlebia vespertina is a species of pronggill mayfly in the family Leptophlebiidae. It is found in Europe.
