= Paraleptophlebia strigula =

Scientific classification
- Kingdom: Animalia
- Phylum: Arthropoda
- Class: Insecta
- Order: Ephemeroptera
- Family: Leptophlebiidae
- Genus: Paraleptophlebia
- Species: P. strigula

Binomial name
- Paraleptophlebia strigula (McDunnough, 1932)

Synonyms
- Leptophlebia strigula McDunnough, 1932

Species of mayfly

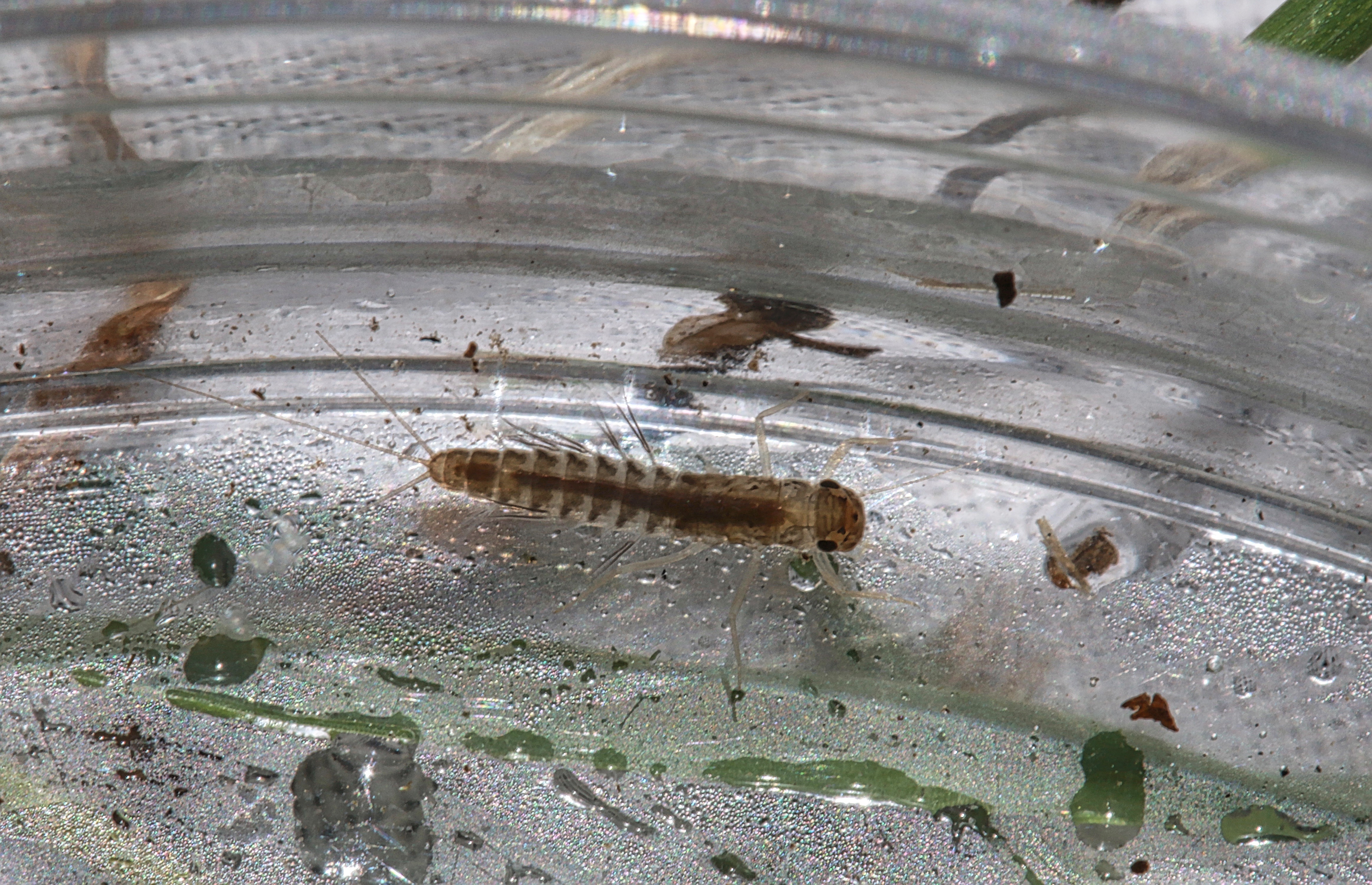

Paraleptophlebia strigula is a species of pronggilled mayfly in the family Leptophlebiidae. It is found in North America.
