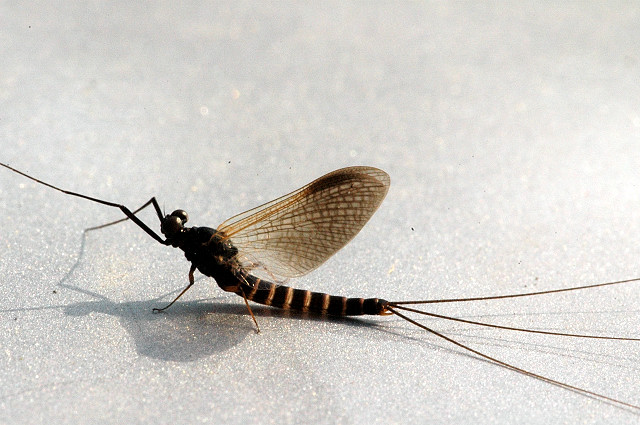

Scientific classification
- Kingdom: Animalia
- Phylum: Arthropoda
- Class: Insecta
- Order: Ephemeroptera
- Family: Leptophlebiidae
- Genus: Leptophlebia
- Species: L. marginata

Binomial name
- Leptophlebia marginata (Linnaeus, 1767)

= Leptophlebia marginata =

Species of mayfly

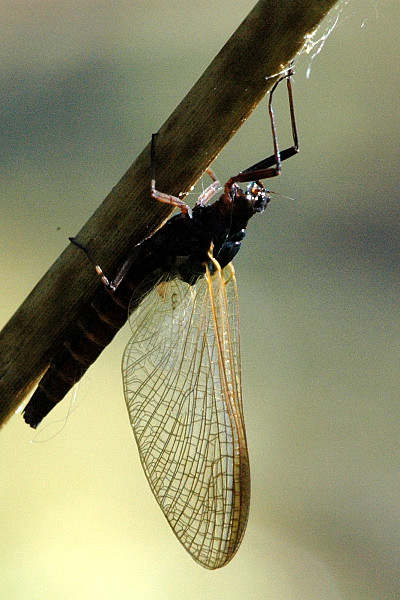
Subimago of L. marginata

Leptophlebia marginata, the sepia dun, is a species of mayfly in the family Leptophlebiidae. It is native to Europe and North America where it is distributed widely near lakes, ponds and slow-moving streams. The larvae, which are known as nymphs, are aquatic.

== Distribution and habitat ==
Leptophlebia marginata occurs in the holarctic region, in Europe and North America, including both temperate and Arctic habitats. It is associated with the edges of lakes and ponds, and the backwaters of slow-moving rivers and streams.

== Ecology ==
Adult Leptophlebia marginata emerge from the aquatic nymph's final moult during daytime in early summer. The final instar nymph crawls to the surface of the water, or climbs onto an emergent plant stem, a stick or a rock, its skin splits and it emerges as a winged adult. The males fly in swarms during the day. Fertilized females have about 1200 eggs and fly over the water, dipping the tips of their abdomens in the water to lay small batches of eggs, or landing briefly on the surface to deposit their eggs. When they finish laying, they are exhausted and soon die.

The eggs hatch into aquatic nymphs which live on or in the sediment at the bottom of shallow water and climb about on submerged plants. They feed on detritus, sifting organic particles from the mud. Their period of development lasts for nearly a year by which time they are ready to transform into adults. There is a single generation each year.

Leptophlebia marginata can act as an alternate host for the parasitic nematode Cystidicoloides tenuissima which infects salmonid fish (salmon and trout) and is found in their stomachs. The mayfly nymph feeds on the eggs of the nematode, and if the nymph is eaten by a fish of the salmonid family, then the fish becomes infected.

== Research ==
Tests were undertaken on the effects of pollutants and acidic conditions on this mayfly. The nymphs were little affected by low pH values and bio-accumulated cadmium with little apparent adverse effect, but emergence was noticeably reduced. In a separate experiment, increasing levels of iron at low and normal pH levels caused the nymphs to stop feeding and become constipated, but few died except at low pH and high levels of iron. When returned to normal conditions, the nymphs resumed feeding and growth.
