= Leptophlebia pacifica =

Scientific classification
- Kingdom: Animalia
- Phylum: Arthropoda
- Class: Insecta
- Order: Ephemeroptera
- Family: Leptophlebiidae
- Genus: Leptophlebia
- Species: L. pacifica

Binomial name
- Leptophlebia pacifica (McDunnough, 1933)

Synonyms
- Blasturus pacificus McDunnough, 1933; Blasturus vibex Traver, 1934; Leptophlebia vibex (Traver, 1934)

Species of mayfly

Leptophlebia pacifica is a species of pronggilled mayfly in the family Leptophlebiidae. It is found in North America.
