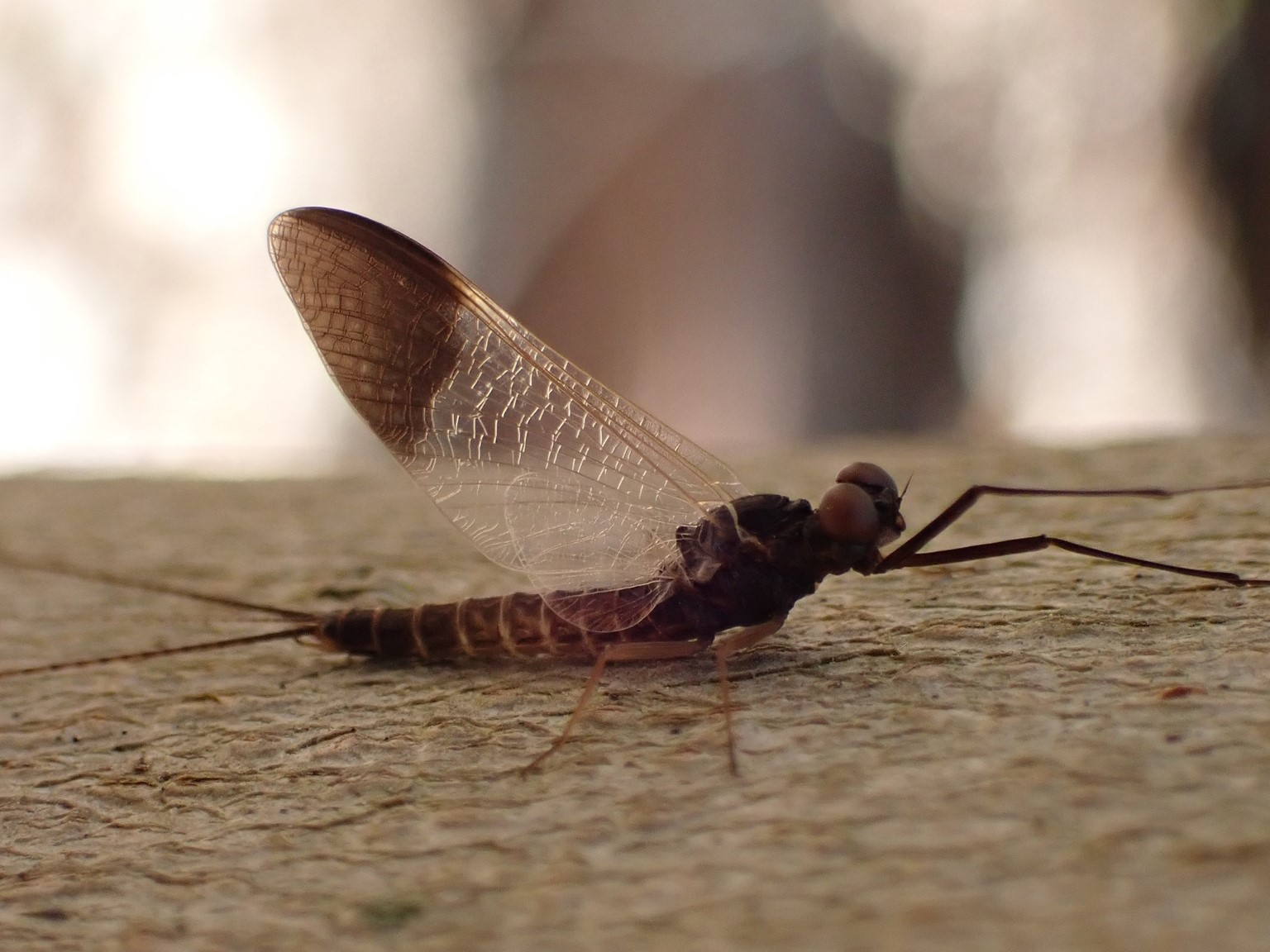

Scientific classification
- Domain: Eukaryota
- Kingdom: Animalia
- Phylum: Arthropoda
- Class: Insecta
- Order: Ephemeroptera
- Family: Leptophlebiidae
- Genus: Leptophlebia
- Species: L. nebulosa

Binomial name
- Leptophlebia nebulosa (Walker, 1853)

Synonyms
- Leptophlebia odonatus (Walsh, 1862); Palingenia nebulosa Walker, 1853; Potamanthus odonatus Walsh, 1862

= Leptophlebia nebulosa =

Species of mayfly

Leptophlebia nebulosa is a species of prong-gilled mayfly in the family Leptophlebiidae. It is found in North America.
