= Aupouriella =

Scientific classification
- Kingdom: Animalia
- Phylum: Arthropoda
- Class: Insecta
- Order: Ephemeroptera
- Family: Leptophlebiidae
- Genus: Aupouriella; Winterbourn, 2009
- Species: A. pohei

Binomial name
- Aupouriella pohei Winterbourn, 2009

Genus of mayfly insects

Aupouriella is genus of mayflies (order Ephemeroptera, family Leptophlebiidae) endemic to northern New Zealand. The genus, first described by Michael J. Winterbourn in 2009, contains the single species Aupouriella pohei. Mayfly adults have wings and larvae are aquatic. The only species in this genus is known from a single stream.

== Taxonomy and description ==
Adult males of Aupouriella are distinctive among New Zealand mayflies because their compound eyes are not divided, unlike most genera. In addition, their genitalia display a ventrally projecting spine partially enclosing the sperm groove and a curved projection on the styliger plate.

Adults Aupouriella pohei are small mayflies, measuring 5.8–7.0 millimetres long. They have pale brown bodies with darker longitudinal markings along the mark, pale yellow legs with darker joints, and transparent (hyaline) wings faintly tinted with golden-brown where the cross veins are located. Nymphs are about 5.9 millimetres in length, with a light brown body marked by distinct dark patches on the head and thorax, narrow bifid gills, and slender legs.

== Distribution and habitat ==
Aupouriella pohei is known only from Whiriwhiri Stream in the Te Paki Ecological District, near North Cape. The species inhabits clear, stony streams flowing through native forests. Despite repeated surveys, it has not been found in nearby streams, indicating an extremely limited range.

Nymphs live among cobbles and gravel in pristine freshwater, where they graze on diatoms and organic detritus from stones, similar to other species in the family leptophlebiidae. Observations suggests that adults may exhibihit non-swarming mating behavior, inferred from their unique eye morphology.

== Conservation ==
With a known range limited to roughly 100 m of a single stream, Aupouriella pohei is considered one of New Zealand's rarest aquatic insects. Its habitat is relatively protected by its remoteness, but no formal conservation management is in place.
