= Paramaka =

Scientific classification
- Kingdom: Animalia
- Phylum: Arthropoda
- Class: Insecta
- Order: Ephemeroptera
- Family: Leptophlebiidae
- Genus: Paramaka; Savage & Dominguez, 1992

Genus of insects

Paramaka is a genus of mayflies in the family Leptophlebiidae, found by Savage and Dominguez in 1992.

== Species ==
- Paramaka antonii Sartori, 2005
- Paramaka convexa (Spieth, 1943)
- Paramaka incognita Domíniguez, Grillet, Nieto, Molineri & Guerrero, 2014
- Paramaka pearljam Mariano, 2011
