= Farrodes =

Scientific classification
- Domain: Eukaryota
- Kingdom: Animalia
- Phylum: Arthropoda
- Class: Insecta
- Order: Ephemeroptera
- Family: Leptophlebiidae
- Genus: Farrodes; Peters, 1971

Genus of mayflies

Farrodes is a genus of mayflies in the family Leptophlebiidae. Like all other members in Leptophlebiidae, Farrodes is characterized by a flat head and lanceolate shaped gills. A key feature in identifying it is the shape of the labrum, which is more rounded at the sides than its close relatives, Thraulodes.
