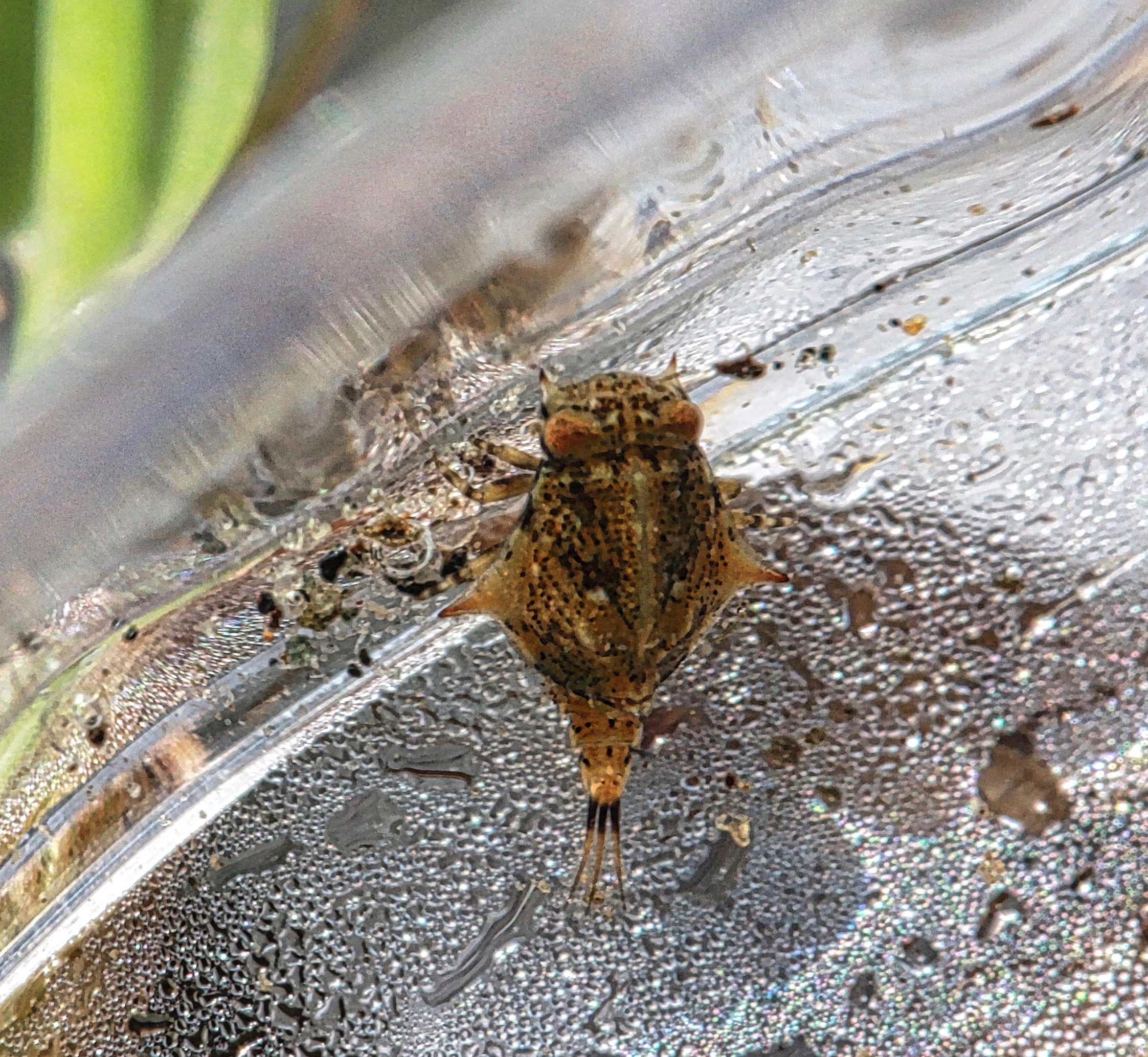
- Baetisca berneri

Scientific classification
- Domain: Eukaryota
- Kingdom: Animalia
- Phylum: Arthropoda
- Class: Insecta
- Order: Ephemeroptera
- Suborder: Furcatergalia

= Furcatergalia =

Suborder of mayflies

Furcatergalia is a suborder of mayflies in the order Ephemeroptera. There are about 14 families and at least 1,700 described species in Furcatergalia.

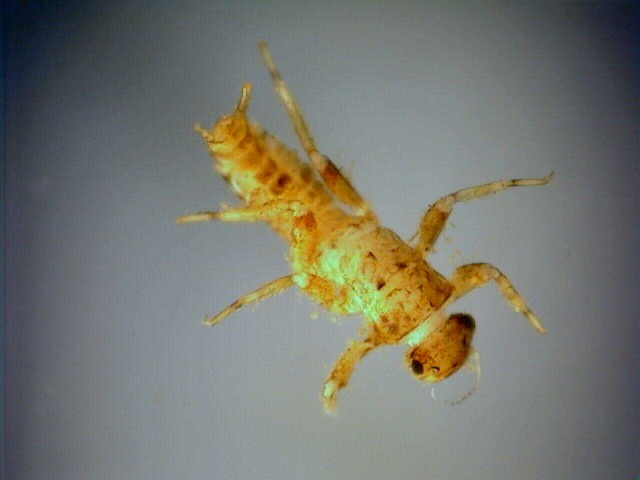
Teloganopsis deficiens

== Families ==
These 14 families belong to the suborder Furcatergalia:

- Baetiscidae
- Behningiidae (sand-burrowing mayflies)
- Caenidae (small squaregilled mayflies)
- Ephemerellidae (spiny crawler mayflies)
- Ephemeridae (common burrower mayflies)
- Euthyplociidae
- Leptohyphidae (little stout crawler mayflies)
- Leptophlebiidae (pronggilled mayflies)
- Neoephemeridae (large squaregill mayflies)
- Palingeniidae (riverbed burrower mayflies)
- Polymitarcyidae (pale burrower mayflies)
- Potamanthidae (hacklegilled burrower mayflies)
- Prosopistomatidae
- Tricorythidae
