= Lisetta =

Scientific classification
- Domain: Eukaryota
- Kingdom: Animalia
- Phylum: Arthropoda
- Class: Insecta
- Order: Ephemeroptera
- Family: Leptophlebiidae
- Genus: Lisetta; Thomas & Dominique, 2005

Genus of insects

Lisetta is a genus of South American mayflies in the family Leptophlebiidae, erected by Thomas and Dominique in 2005. It is monotypic, containing the species Lisetta ernsti Thomas & Dominique, 2005.
