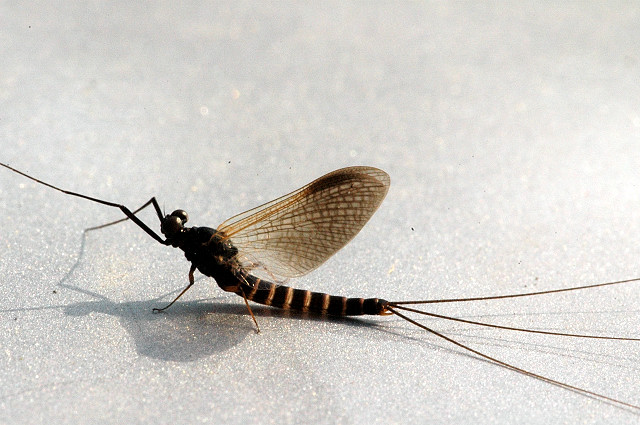
- Leptophlebia marginata

Scientific classification
- Domain: Eukaryota
- Kingdom: Animalia
- Phylum: Arthropoda
- Class: Insecta
- Order: Ephemeroptera
- Family: Leptophlebiidae
- Genus: Leptophlebia; Westwood, 1840

= Leptophlebia =

Genus of mayflies

Leptophlebia is a genus of mayflies in the family Leptophlebiidae.

== Species ==
- Leptophlebia bradleyi
- Leptophlebia cupida – Early brown spinner
- Leptophlebia duplex
- Leptophlebia intermedia
- Leptophlebia johnsoni
- Leptophlebia konza
- Leptophlebia marginata – Sepia dun
- Leptophlebia nebulosa
- Leptophlebia pacifica
- Leptophlebia simplex
- Leptophlebia vespertina – Claret dun
- Leptophlebia wui
