= Choroterpes =

Scientific classification
- Domain: Eukaryota
- Kingdom: Animalia
- Phylum: Arthropoda
- Class: Insecta
- Order: Ephemeroptera
- Family: Leptophlebiidae
- Genus: Choroterpes; Eaton, 1881

Genus of mayflies

External image
- Images at iNaturalist

Choroterpes is a genus of mayflies in the family Leptophlebiidae faound in the Americas, Europe (not the British Isles), Africa and Asia.

== Species ==
The following are included in BioLib.cz:

1. Choroterpes alagarensis Dinakaran, Balachandran & Anbalagan, 2009
2. Choroterpes albiannulata McDunnough, 1924
3. Choroterpes andamanensis Vasanth, Subramanian & Selvakumar, 2021
4. Choroterpes angustifolius Kluge et al., 2022
5. Choroterpes armillatus Kluge et al., 2022
6. Choroterpes atelobranchis Kluge et al., 2022
7. Choroterpes atlas Soldán & Thomas, 1983
8. Choroterpes basalis (Banks, 1900)
9. Choroterpes bogori Kluge, 2014
10. Choroterpes borbonica Belfiore, 1988
11. Choroterpes cataractae Kluge, 2012
12. Choroterpes facialis (Gillies, 1951)
13. Choroterpes girigangaensis Kubendran & Vasanth, 2022
14. Choroterpes gregoryi Avila & Flowers, 2006
15. Choroterpes hainanensis You & Gui, 1995
16. Choroterpes inornata Eaton, 1892
17. Choroterpes kaegies Selvakumar, Subramanian, Chandra & Jehamalar, 2017
18. Choroterpes kumaradhara Muthukatturaja & Balasubramanian, 2022
19. Choroterpes latus Kluge et al., 2022
20. Choroterpes lesbosensis Gaino & Sowa, 1985
21. Choroterpes mairena Avila & Flowers, 2006
22. Choroterpes major Ulmer, 1939
23. Choroterpes minor Dang, 1967
24. Choroterpes nambiyarensis Selva-Kumar, Arunachalam & Sivaramakrishnan, 2013
25. Choroterpes nandini Selvakumar et al., 2015
26. Choroterpes ndebele Agnew, 1962
27. Choroterpes nervosa Eaton, 1892
28. Choroterpes nicobarensis Selvakumar & Chandra, 2017
29. Choroterpes nigella Kang & Yang, 1994
30. Choroterpes nigrescens Barnard, 1932
31. Choroterpes pacis Sartori, 1991
32. Choroterpes petersi Tong & Dudgeon, 2003
33. Choroterpes picteti (Eaton, 1871)
34. Choroterpes prati Gaino & Puig, 1996
35. Choroterpes proba Ulmer, 1939
36. Choroterpes salamannai Gaino & Puig, 1996
37. Choroterpes taiwanensis Kang & Yang, 1994
38. Choroterpes terratoma Seemann, 1927
39. Choroterpes ungulus Lugo-Ortiz & McCafferty, 1996
40. Choroterpes unicolor Kluge et al., 2022
41. Choroterpes vinculum Traver, 1947
42. Choroterpes volubilis Thomas & Vitte, 1988
