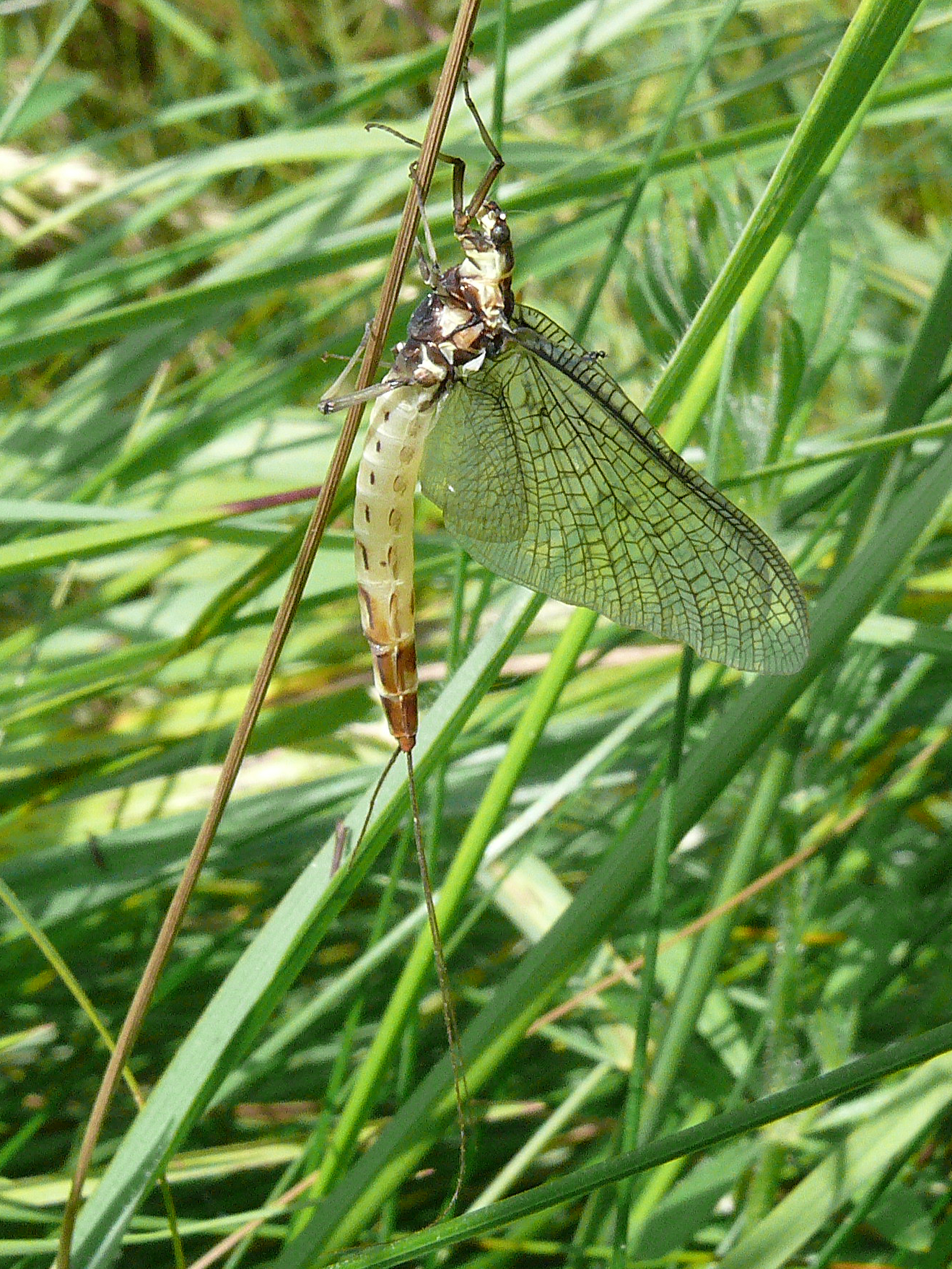
- Ephoron virgo

Scientific classification
- Domain: Eukaryota
- Kingdom: Animalia
- Phylum: Arthropoda
- Class: Insecta
- Order: Ephemeroptera
- Family: Polymitarcyidae
- Genus: Ephoron; Williamson, 1802

= Ephoron =

Genus of mayflies

Ephoron is a genus of mayflies in the family Polymitarcyidae. There are about 15 described species in Ephoron.

== Species ==
These 15 species belong to the genus Ephoron:

- Ephoron album (Say, 1824)^{i c g b} (white fly)
- Ephoron annandalei (Chopra, 1927)^{c g}
- Ephoron birmanus Navás, 1933^{c g}
- Ephoron eophilum Ishiwata, 1996^{c g}
- Ephoron indica (Pictet, 1843)^{c g}
- Ephoron leucon Williamson, 1802^{c g}
- Ephoron leukon Williamson, 1802^{i g b} (white fly)
- Ephoron limnobium Ishiwata, 1996^{c g}
- Ephoron nakamurae Matsumura, 1941^{c g}
- Ephoron nanchangi (Hsu, 1937)^{c g}
- Ephoron nigridorsum (Tshernova, 1934)^{c g}
- Ephoron punensis (Dubey, 1971)^{c g}
- Ephoron savignyi (Pictet, 1843)^{c g}
- Ephoron shigae (Takahashi, 1924)^{c g}
- Ephoron virgo (Olivier, 1791)^{c g}

Data sources: i = ITIS, c = Catalogue of Life, g = GBIF, b = Bugguide.net
