= Adeana =

Scientific classification
- Kingdom: Animalia
- Phylum: Arthropoda
- Clade: Pancrustacea
- Class: Insecta
- Order: Lepidoptera
- Family: Cosmopterigidae
- Subfamily: Cosmopteriginae
- Genus: Adeana; J.F.G.Clarke, 1986
- Species: A. leucoxantha

Binomial name
- Adeana leucoxantha (Meyrick, 1927)

Synonyms
- Labdia leuxoxantha Meyrick, 1927

Genus of moths

Adeana is a gelechioid moth genus usually placed in the cosmet moth family (Cosmopterigidae), subfamily Cosmopteriginae. Only a single species is known, Adeana leucoxantha. It occurs in southern Polynesia.

This genus may be allied to the enigmatic Clarkeophlebia argentea (another Polynesian species) and/or Asymphorodes and/or Labdia (where A. leucoxantha was originally placed). Asymphorodes, however, has more recently been assigned to the palm moths of the (somewhat disputed) family Agonoxenidae. This may thus be correct for Adeana (and Clarkeophlebia) too.
