= Thraulodes =

Scientific classification
- Domain: Eukaryota
- Kingdom: Animalia
- Phylum: Arthropoda
- Class: Insecta
- Order: Ephemeroptera
- Family: Leptophlebiidae
- Genus: Thraulodes; Ulmer, 1920

Genus of mayflies

Thraulodes is a genus of mayflies in the family Leptophlebiidae.
