= Traverella =

Scientific classification
- Domain: Eukaryota
- Kingdom: Animalia
- Phylum: Arthropoda
- Class: Insecta
- Order: Ephemeroptera
- Family: Leptophlebiidae
- Genus: Traverella; Edmunds, 1948

Genus of mayflies

Traverella is a genus of pronggilled mayflies in the family Leptophlebiidae.

== Species ==
These 13 species belong to the genus Traverella:

- Traverella albertana (McDunnough, 1931)^{i c g b}
- Traverella bradleyi (Needham & Murphy, 1924)^{c}
- Traverella calingastensis Domínguez, 1995^{c g}
- Traverella holzenthali Lugo-Ortiz and McCafferty, 1996^{i c g}
- Traverella insolita^{g}
- Traverella lewisi Allen, 1973^{i c g}
- Traverella longifrons Lugo-Ortiz and McCafferty, 1996^{i c g}
- Traverella montium (Ulmer, 1943)^{c g}
- Traverella presidiana (Traver, 1934)^{i c g}
- Traverella promifrons Lugo-Ortiz and McCafferty, 1996^{i c g}
- Traverella sallei (Navás, 1935)^{i c g}
- Traverella valdemari (Esben-Petersen, 1912)^{c g}
- Traverella versicolor (Eaton, 1892)^{i c}

Data sources: i = ITIS, c = Catalogue of Life, g = GBIF, b = Bugguide.net
