= Cystidicoloides =

Scientific classification
- Kingdom: Animalia
- Phylum: Nematoda
- Class: Chromadorea
- Order: Rhabditida
- Family: Cystidicolidae
- Genus: Cystidicoloides; Skinker, 1931

Genus of roundworms

Cystidicoloides is a genus of nematodes belonging to the family Cystidicolidae.

Species:

- Cystidicoloides dlouhyi Petter, 1984
- Cystidicoloides ephemeridarum (Linstow, 1872)
- Cystidicoloides fischeri Travassos, Artigas & Pereira, 1928
- Cystidicoloides tenuissima Zeder, 1800
- Cystidicoloides truttae (Baylis, 1935)
- Cystidicoloides uniseriata Valovaya & Walter, 1988
- Cystidicoloides vaucheri Petter, 1984
