= Neochoroterpes =

Scientific classification
- Kingdom: Animalia
- Phylum: Arthropoda
- Clade: Pancrustacea
- Class: Insecta
- Order: Ephemeroptera
- Family: Leptophlebiidae
- Genus: Neochoroterpes; Allen, 1974

Genus of mayflies

Neochoroterpes is a genus of mayflies in the family Leptophlebiidae. It is endemic to Southwestern North America. The larvae live in lotic freshwater habitats. In 1974, Richard K. Allen discovered the genus and originally described it as a subgenus, before it was elevated to a full genus status. It includes species such as Neochoroterpes oklahoma, Neochoroterpes nanita, Neochoroterpes kossi, and Neochoroterpes orientalis.
