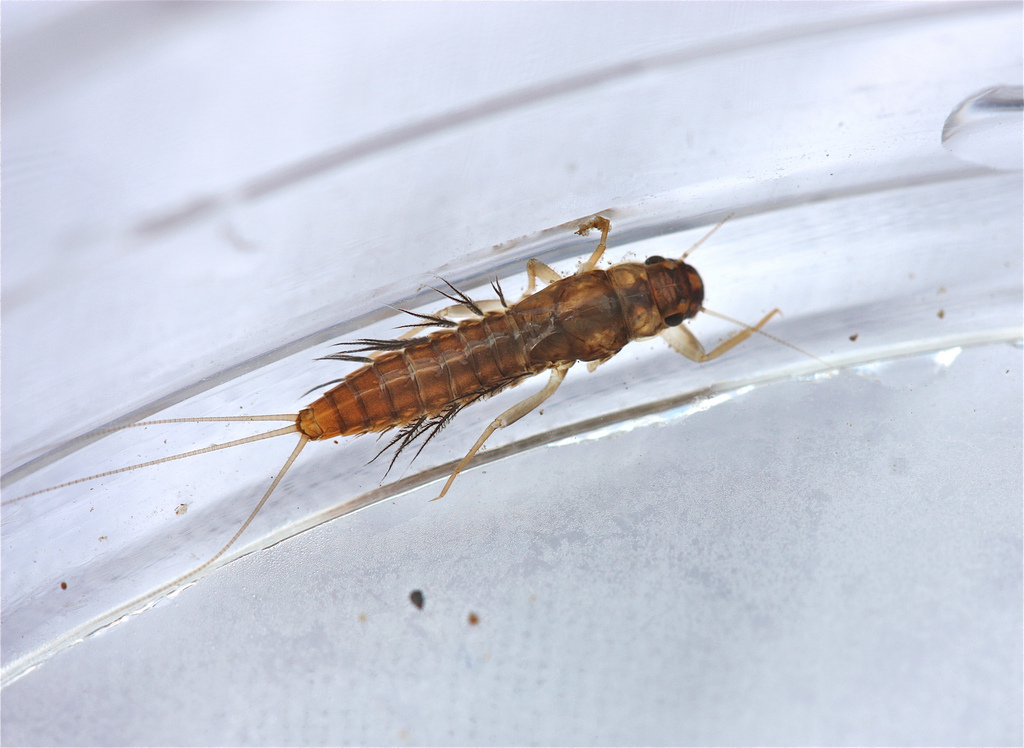

Scientific classification
- Kingdom: Animalia
- Phylum: Arthropoda
- Clade: Pancrustacea
- Class: Insecta
- Order: Ephemeroptera
- Family: Leptophlebiidae
- Genus: Paraleptophlebia; Lestage, 1917

= Paraleptophlebia =

Genus of mayflies

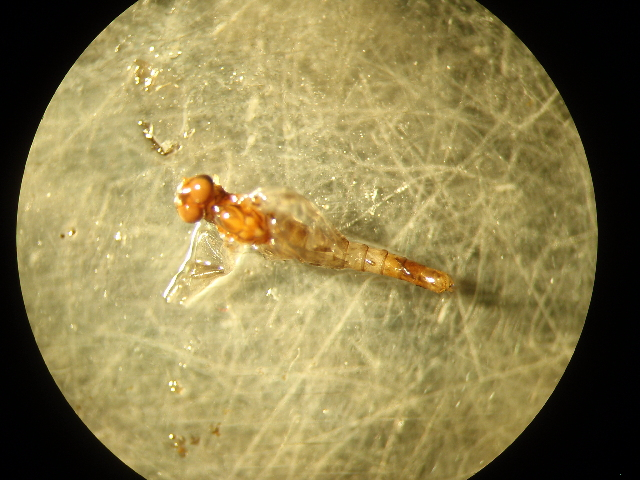
Paraleptophlebia guttata

Paraleptophlebia is a genus of mayflies in the family Leptophlebiidae. Commonly found in North America and parts of Western Europe including the British Isles.

== Species ==
These 57 species belong to the genus Paraleptophlebia:

- Paraleptophlebia adoptiva (McDunnough, 1929)^{i c g}
- Paraleptophlebia altana Kilgore and Allen, 1973^{i c g}
- Paraleptophlebia aquilina Harper and Harper, 1986^{i c g}
- Paraleptophlebia assimilis (Banks, 1914)^{i c g}
- Paraleptophlebia associata (McDunnough, 1924)^{i c g}
- Paraleptophlebia bicornuta (McDunnough, 1926)^{i c g b}
- Paraleptophlebia bruneipennis (McDunnough, 1924)^{c g}
- Paraleptophlebia brunneipennis (McDunnough, 1924)^{i}
- Paraleptophlebia cachea Day, 1954^{i c g}
- Paraleptophlebia calcarica Robotham and Allen, 1988^{i c g}
- Paraleptophlebia californica Traver, 1934^{i c g}
- Paraleptophlebia cincta (Retzius, 1783)^{c g}
- Paraleptophlebia clara (McDunnough, 1933)^{i c g}
- Paraleptophlebia curvata Ulmer, 1927^{c g}
- Paraleptophlebia debilis (Walker, 1853)^{i c g b} (mahogany dun)
- Paraleptophlebia erratica Kang & Yang, 1994^{c g}
- Paraleptophlebia falcula Traver, 1934^{i c g}
- Paraleptophlebia georgiana Traver, 1934^{i c g}
- Paraleptophlebia gregalis (Eaton, 1884)^{i c g}
- Paraleptophlebia guttata (McDunnough, 1924)^{i c g b}
- Paraleptophlebia helena Day, 1952^{i c g b}
- Paraleptophlebia heteronea (McDunnough, 1924)^{i c g}
- Paraleptophlebia japonica Matsumura, 1931^{c g}
- Paraleptophlebia jeanae Berner, 1955^{i c g}
- Paraleptophlebia jenseni McCafferty and Kondratieff, 1999^{i c g}
- Paraleptophlebia kirchneri Kondratieff and Durfee, 1994^{i c g}
- Paraleptophlebia kunashirica Tiunova, 2017^{g}
- Paraleptophlebia lacustris Ikonomov, 1962^{c g}
- Paraleptophlebia longilobata (Tshernova, 1928)^{c g}
- Paraleptophlebia magica Zhou & Zheng, 2004^{c g}
- Paraleptophlebia memorialis (Eaton, 1884)^{i c g}
- Paraleptophlebia moerens (McDunnough, 1924)^{i c g}
- Paraleptophlebia mollis (Eaton, 1871)^{i c g}
- Paraleptophlebia ontario (McDunnough, 1926)^{i c g}
- Paraleptophlebia packi (Needham, 1927)^{c g}
- Paraleptophlebia packii (Needham, 1927)^{i}
- Paraleptophlebia placeri Mayo, 1939^{i c g}
- Paraleptophlebia praepedita (Eaton, 1884)^{i c g b}
- Paraleptophlebia quisquilia Day, 1952^{i c g}
- Paraleptophlebia ruffoi Biancheri, 1956^{c g}
- Paraleptophlebia rufivenosa (Eaton, 1884)^{i c g}
- Paraleptophlebia sculleni Traver, 1934^{i c g}
- Paraleptophlebia spina Kang & Yang, 1994^{c g}
- Paraleptophlebia spinosa Uéno, 1931^{c g}
- Paraleptophlebia sticta Burks, 1953^{i c g}
- Paraleptophlebia strandii (Eaton, 1901)^{c g}
- Paraleptophlebia strigula (McDunnough, 1932)^{i c g b}
- Paraleptophlebia submarginata (Stephens, 1835)^{c g}
- Paraleptophlebia swannanoa (Traver, 1932)^{i c g}
- Paraleptophlebia temporalis (McDunnough, 1926)^{i c g}
- Paraleptophlebia traverae McCafferty and Kondratieff, 1999^{i c g}
- Paraleptophlebia vaciva (Eaton, 1884)^{i c g b}
- Paraleptophlebia vladivostokica Kluge, 1982^{c g}
- Paraleptophlebia volitans (McDunnough, 1924)^{i c g}
- Paraleptophlebia werneri Ulmer, 1920^{c g}
- Paraleptophlebia westoni Imanishi, 1937^{c g}
- Paraleptophlebia zayante Day, 1952^{i c g}

Data sources: i = ITIS, c = Catalogue of Life, g = GBIF, b = Bugguide.net
