= Borinquena =

Scientific classification
- Domain: Eukaryota
- Kingdom: Animalia
- Phylum: Arthropoda
- Class: Insecta
- Order: Ephemeroptera
- Family: Leptophlebiidae
- Genus: Borinquena; Traver, 1938

Genus of insects

Borinquena is a genus of Caribbean mayflies in the family Leptophlebiidae, erected by Traver in 1938.

== Species ==
- Borinquena carmencita Traver, 1938
- Borinquena contradicens Traver, 1938
