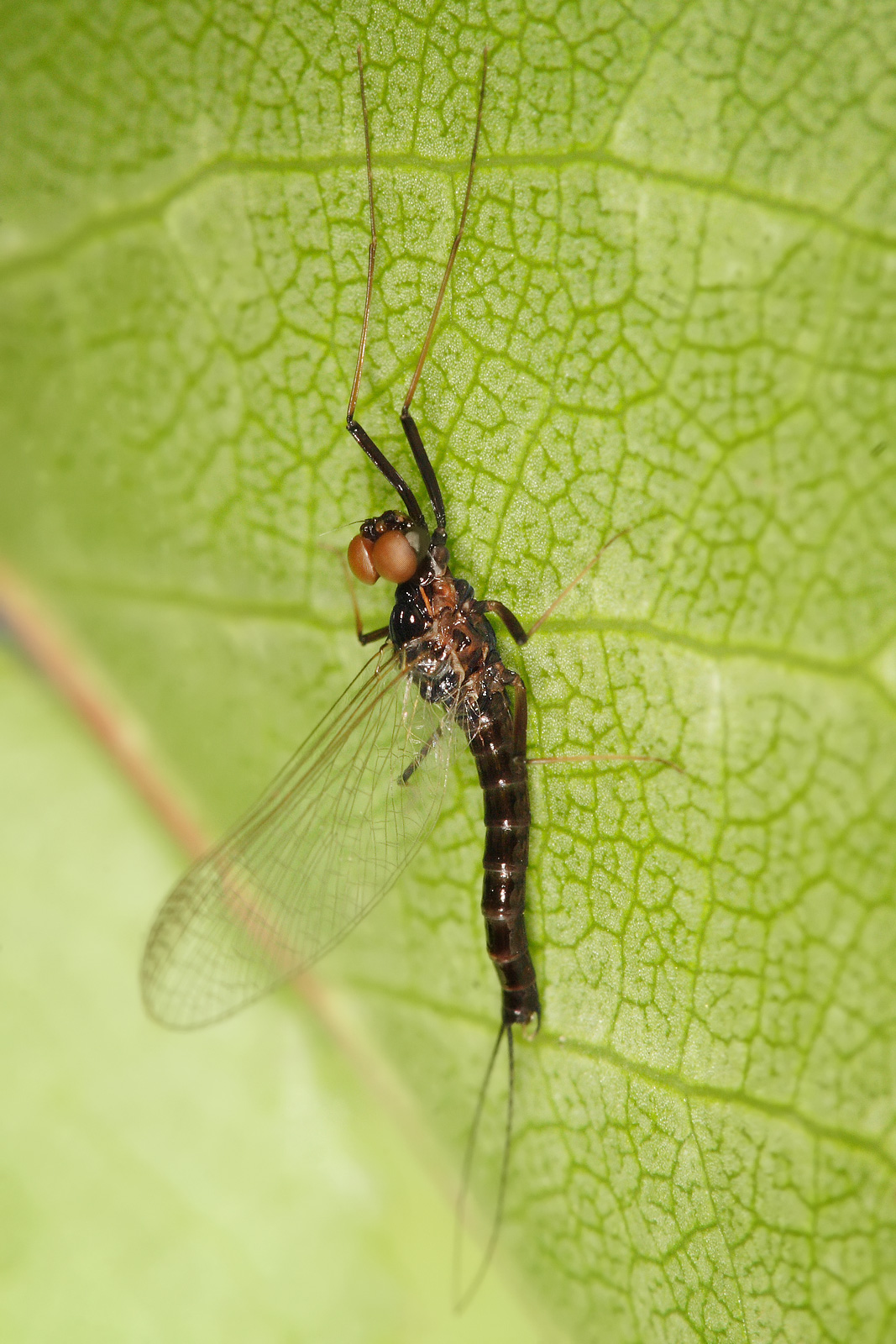
- Adult Atalophlebia with the cylindrical dorsal or turban eyes visible

Scientific classification
- Kingdom: Animalia
- Phylum: Arthropoda
- Clade: Pancrustacea
- Class: Insecta
- Order: Ephemeroptera
- Family: Leptophlebiidae
- Genus: Atalophlebia; Eaton, 1881

= Atalophlebia =

Genus of mayflies

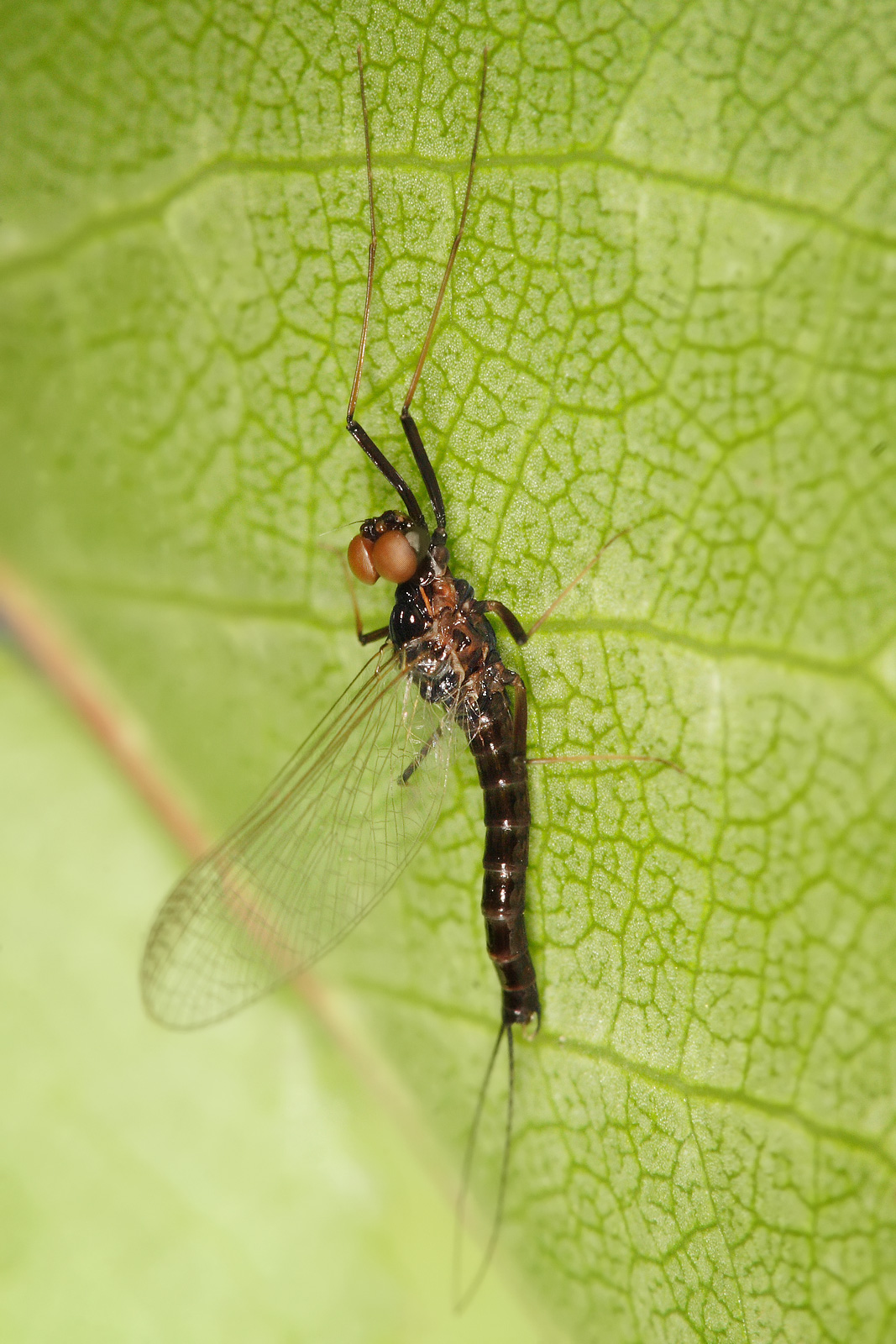
Adult Atalophlebia with the cylindrical dorsal or turban eyes visible

Atalophlebia is a genus of mayflies in the family Leptophlebiidae. They can be found in Australia.

== Species ==
The genus contains the following species:

- Atalophlebia albiterminata
- Atalophlebia aurata
- Atalophlebia australasica
- Atalophlebia australis
- Atalophlebia darrunga
- Atalophlebia gubara
- Atalophlebia hudsoni
- Atalophlebia ida
- Atalophlebia incerta
- Atalophlebia kala
- Atalophlebia kokunia
- Atalophlebia longicaudata
- Atalophlebia maculosa
- Atalophlebia marowana
- Atalophlebia miunga
- Atalophlebia pallida
- Atalophlebia pierda
- Atalophlebia superba
- Atalophlebia tuhla
