= Miroculis =

Scientific classification
- Domain: Eukaryota
- Kingdom: Animalia
- Phylum: Arthropoda
- Class: Insecta
- Order: Ephemeroptera
- Family: Leptophlebiidae
- Genus: Miroculis; Edmunds, 1963

Genus of mayflies

Miroculis is a genus of pronggill mayflies in the family Leptophlebiidae. There are more than 20 described species in Miroculis.

== Species ==
These 22 species belong to the genus Miroculis:

- Miroculis amazonicus Savage & Peters, 1983
- Miroculis bicoloratus Savage, 1987
- Miroculis brasiliensis Savage & Peters, 1983
- Miroculis caparaoensis Salles & Lima, 2011
- Miroculis chiribiquete Peters, Domínguez & Dereser, 2008
- Miroculis cohnhafti Boldrini, 2017
- Miroculis colombiensis Savage & Peters, 1983
- Miroculis duckensis Savage & Peters, 1983
- Miroculis eldorado Gama-Neto & Hamada, 2014
- Miroculis fazzariensis
- Miroculis fittkaui Savage & Peters, 1983
- Miroculis froehlichi Savage & Peters, 1983
- Miroculis marauiae Savage & Peters, 1983
- Miroculis mocidade Boldrini, 2017
- Miroculis mourei Savage & Peters, 1983
- Miroculis nebulosus Savage, 1987
- Miroculis rossi Edmunds, 1963
- Miroculis stenopterus
- Miroculis tepequensis
- Miroculis wandae Savage & Peters, 1983
- Miroculis xavieri Boldrini, 2017
- Miroculis yulieae Raimundi, Cabette, Brasil & Salles, 2017
