= Tikuna =

Scientific classification
- Kingdom: Animalia
- Phylum: Arthropoda
- Class: Insecta
- Order: Ephemeroptera
- Family: Leptophlebiidae
- Genus: Tikuna; Savage, Flowers & Porras, 2005

Genus of insects

Tikuna is a genus of central and South American mayflies in the family Leptophlebiidae, erected by Harry Savage, Wills Flowers, and Wendy Porras in 2005.

== Species ==
- Tikuna atramentum - type species
- Tikuna bilineata
- Tikuna fusconotum
- Tikuna nigrobulla
