= Povilla =

Scientific classification
- Domain: Eukaryota
- Kingdom: Animalia
- Phylum: Arthropoda
- Class: Insecta
- Order: Ephemeroptera
- Family: Polymitarcyidae
- Genus: Povilla; Navás, 1912

Genus of insects

Povilla is a genus of mayflies belonging to the family Polymitarcyidae.

The species of this genus are found in Southern Africa.

Species:

- Povilla adusta Navás, 1912
- Povilla andamanensis Hubbard, 1984
- Povilla cambodjensis Ulmer, 1920
- Povilla heardi Hubbard, 1984
- Povilla junki Hubbard, 1984
- Povilla taprobanes Hubbard, 1984
- Povilla ulmeri Hubbard, 1984
