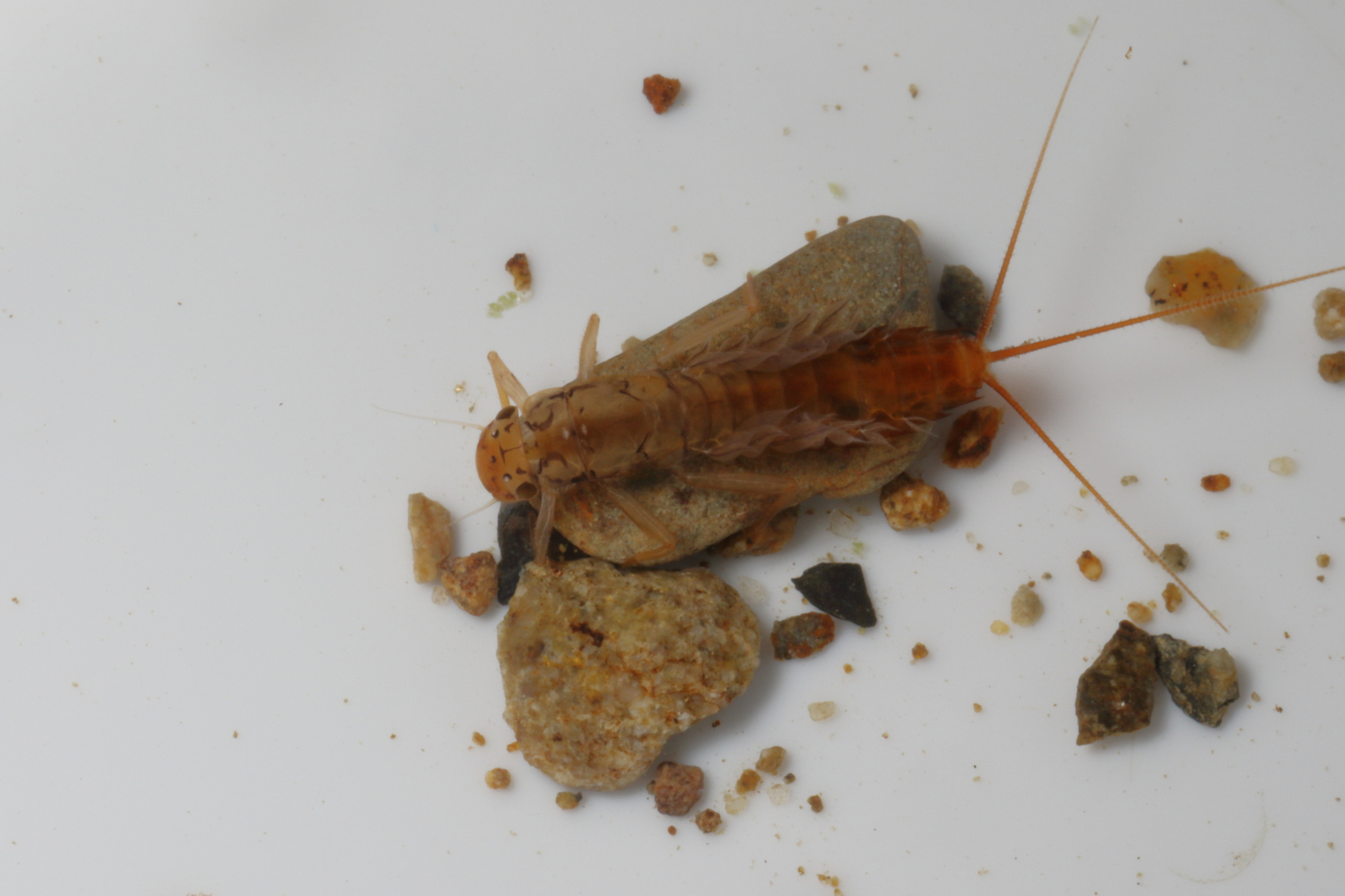
- A. cruentata larva
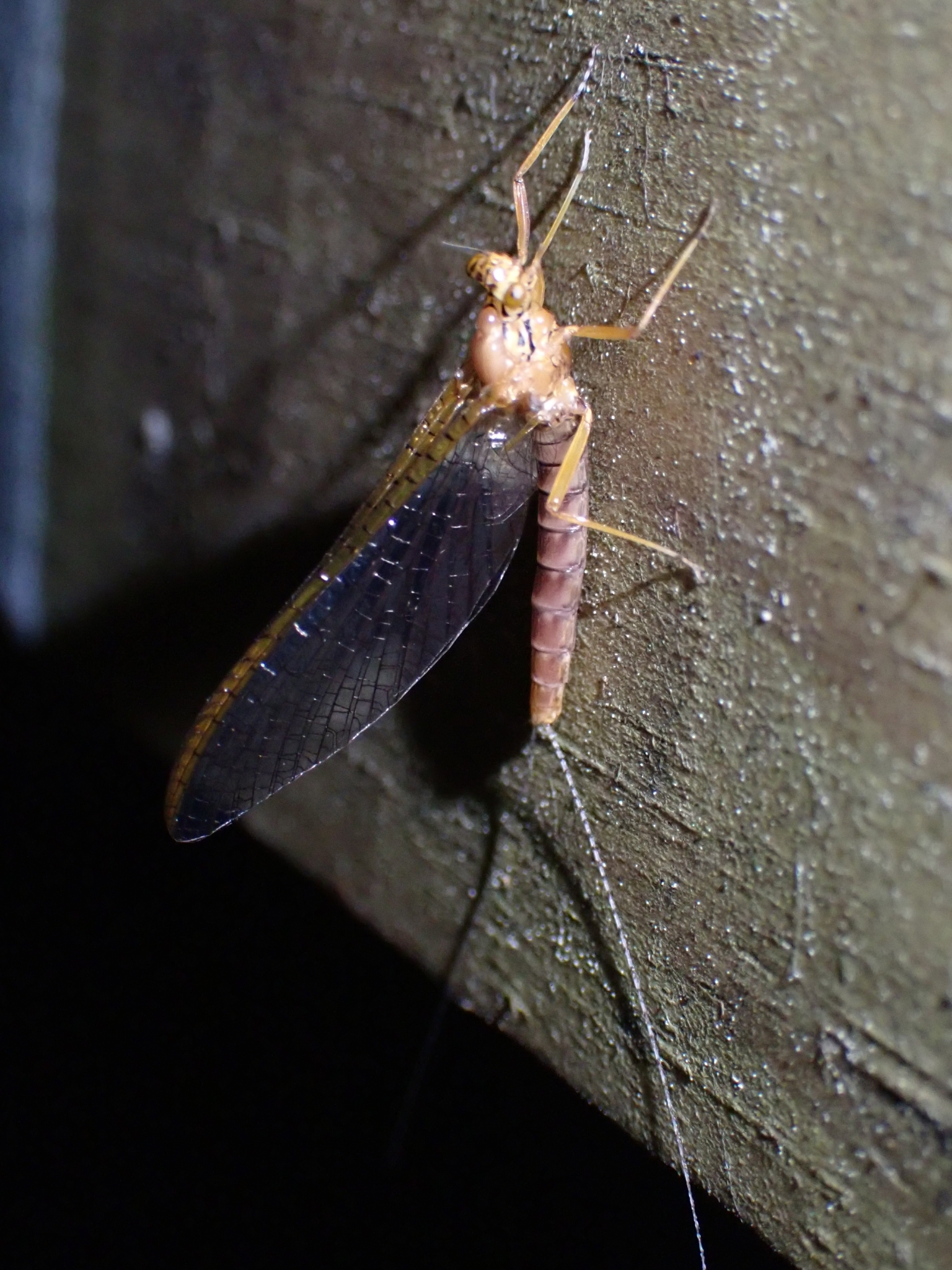
- A. cruentata adult

Conservation status
- Not Threatened (NZ TCS)

Scientific classification
- Kingdom: Animalia
- Phylum: Arthropoda
- Class: Insecta
- Order: Ephemeroptera
- Family: Leptophlebiidae
- Genus: Acanthophlebia; Towns, 1983
- Species: A. cruentata

Binomial name
- Acanthophlebia cruentata (Hudson, 1904)

Synonyms
- Atalophlebia cruentata Hudson, 1904

= Acanthophlebia =

Genus of mayflies

Acanthophlebia is a genus of pronggill mayflies in the family Leptophlebiidae. There is one described species in Acanthophlebia, Acanthophlebia cruentata.

== Taxonomy ==
George Hudson first described Acanthophlebia cruentata under the name Atalophlebia cruentata in his book New Zealand Neuroptera in 1904.

== Distribution ==
This species is endemic to New Zealand and found only in the North Island.
