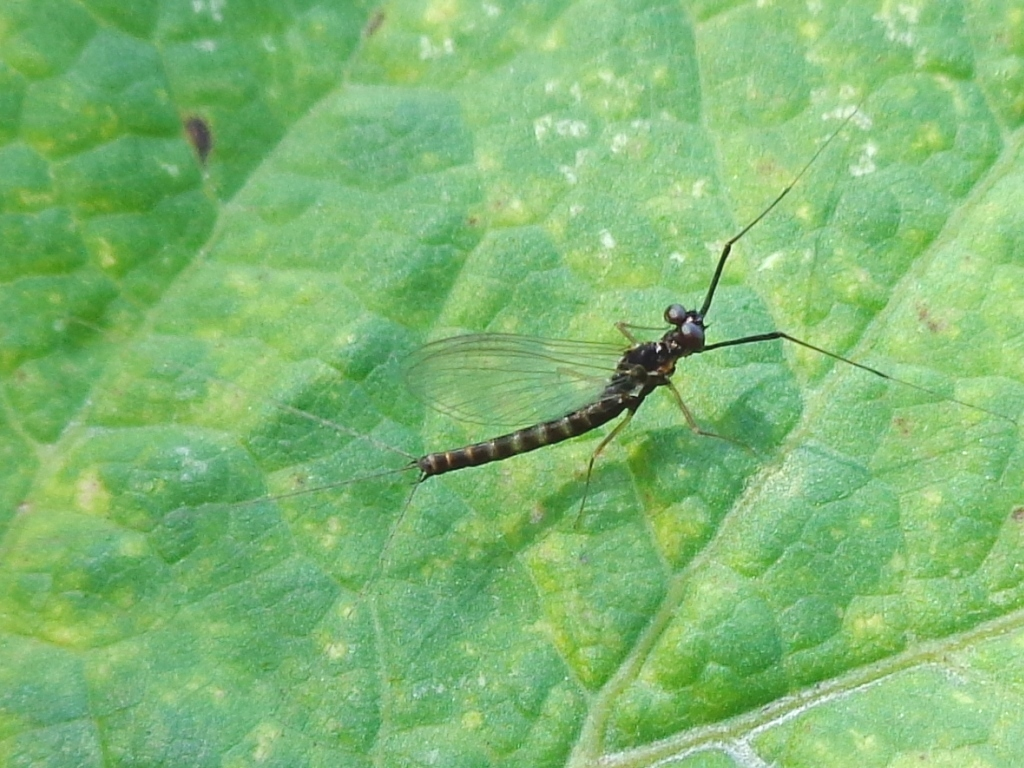

Scientific classification
- Domain: Eukaryota
- Kingdom: Animalia
- Phylum: Arthropoda
- Class: Insecta
- Order: Ephemeroptera
- Family: Leptophlebiidae
- Genus: Habrophlebia; Eaton, 1881

Synonyms
- Hesperaphlebia Peters, 1979

= Habrophlebia =

Genus of mayflies

Habrophlebia is a genus of prong-gilled mayflies in the family Leptophlebiidae. Species of Habrophlebia have been recorded from the Palaearctic and Nearctic realms.

== Species ==
These species belong to the genus Habrophlebia:

1. Habrophlebia antoninoi Alba-Tercedor, 2000^{c g}
2. Habrophlebia consiglioi Biancheri, 1959^{c g}
3. Habrophlebia djurdjurensis Kechemir, Sartori & Lounaci, 2020
4. Habrophlebia eldae Jacob & Sartori, 1984^{c g}
5. Habrophlebia fusca (Curtis, 1834)
6. Habrophlebia gilliesi Peter, 1963
7. Habrophlebia hassainae Benhadji, Hassaine & Sartori, 2018
8. Habrophlebia lauta McLachlan, 1884^{c g}
9. Habrophlebia tenella Kang & Yang, 1994
10. Habrophlebia vaillantorum Thomas, 1986^{c g}
11. Habrophlebia vibrans Needham, 1908^{i c g b}

Data sources: i = ITIS, c = Catalogue of Life, g = GBIF, b = Bugguide.net
