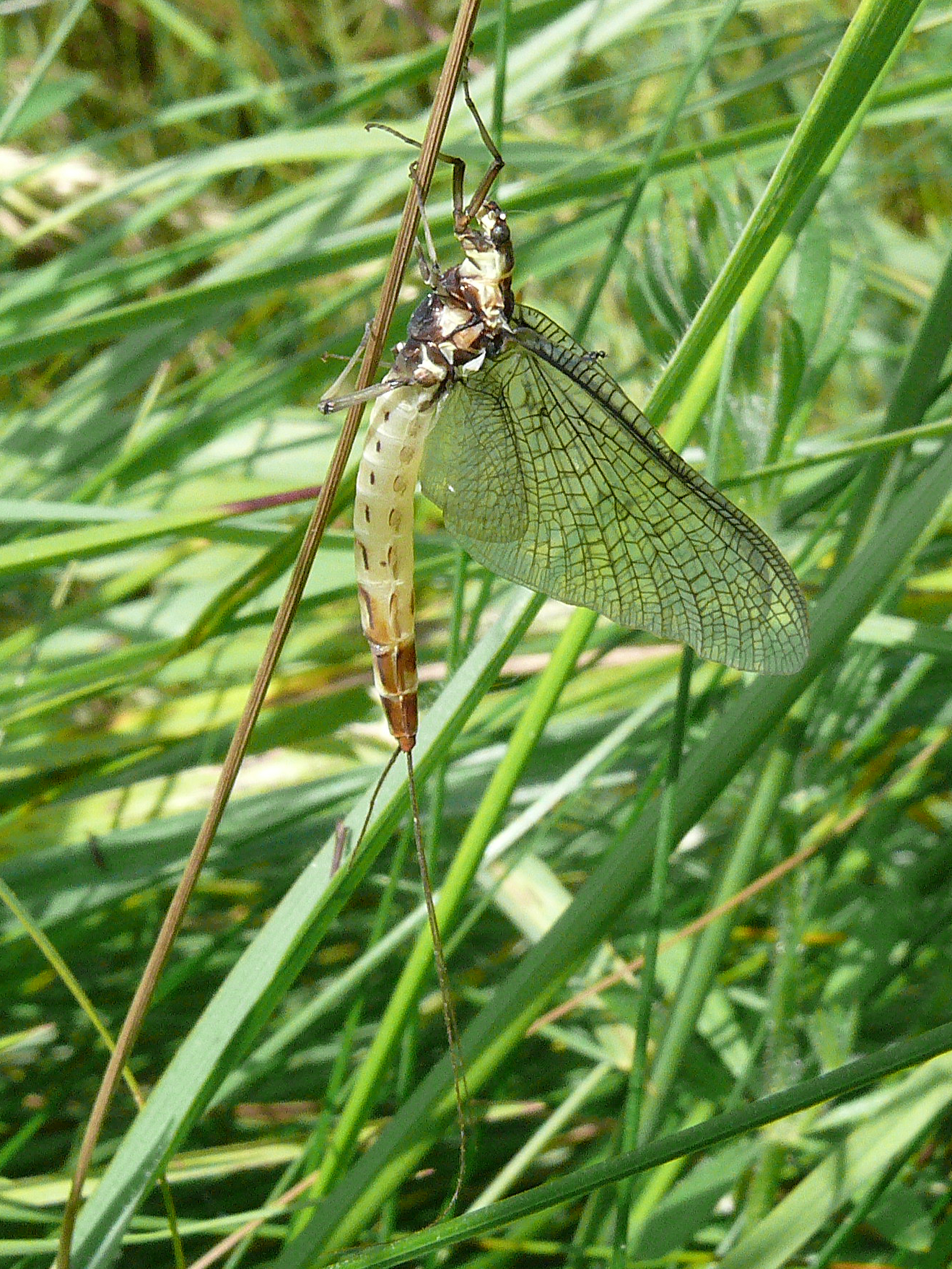
- Ephoron virgo

Scientific classification
- Domain: Eukaryota
- Kingdom: Animalia
- Phylum: Arthropoda
- Class: Insecta
- Order: Ephemeroptera
- Suborder: Schistonota
- Superfamily: Ephemeroidea
- Family: Polymitarcyidae

= Polymitarcyidae =

Family of mayflies

Polymitarcyidae is a family of pale burrower mayflies in the order Ephemeroptera. There are about 10 genera and more than 90 described species in Polymitarcyidae.

== Genera ==
These 10 genera belong to the family Polymitarcyidae:

- Asthenopus Eaton, 1871
- Campsurus Eaton, 1871
- Ephoron Williamson, 1802 (white flies)
- Languidipes
- Povilla Navás, 1912
- Pristiplocia McCafferty, 1990
- Tortopsis Molineri, 2010
- Tortopus Needham & Murphy, 1924
- † Cretomitarcys Sinitshenkova, 2000
- † Palaeoanthus Kluge, 1994
