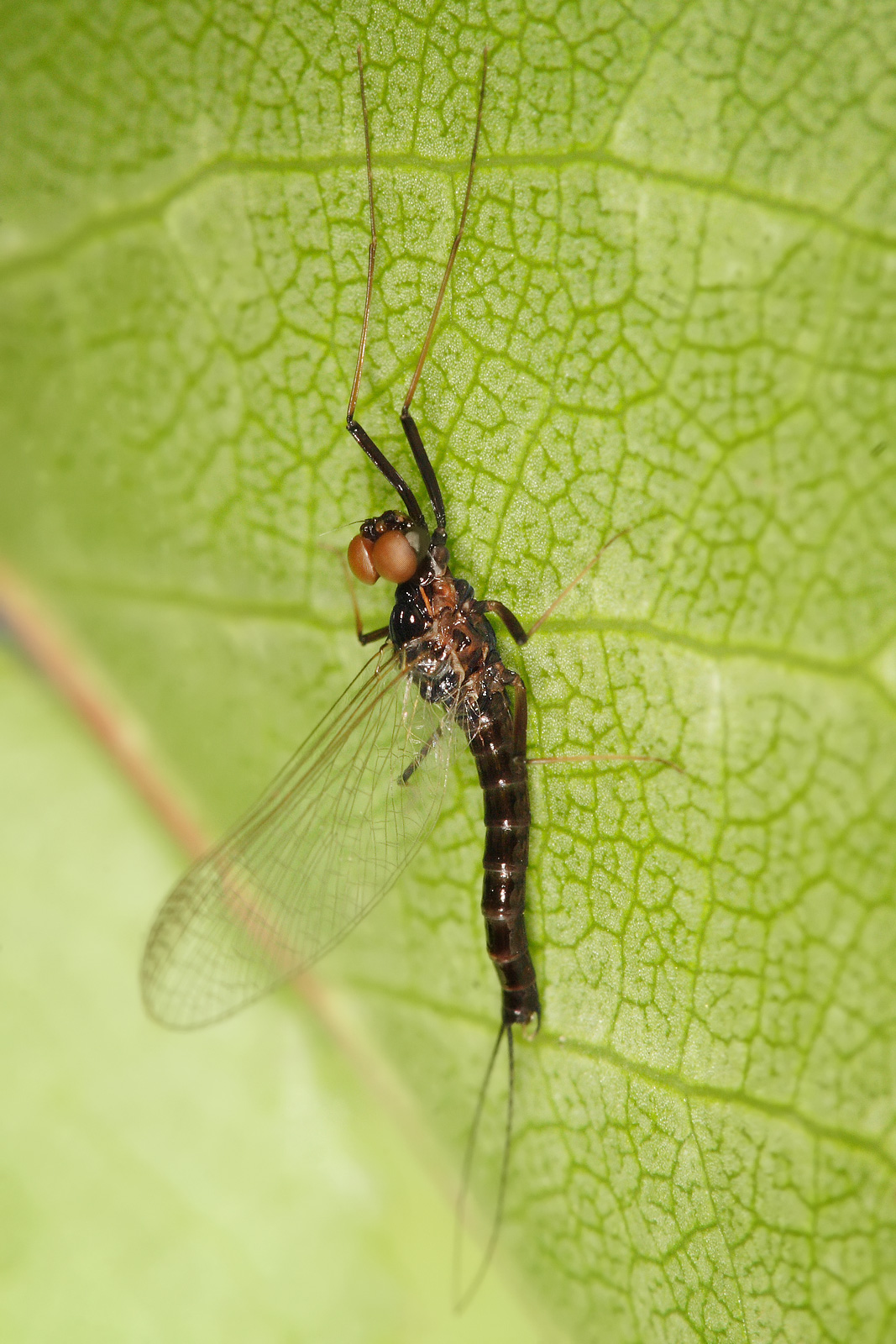
- Male imago of undetermined Atalophlebia species from Swifts Creek, Victoria (Australia)
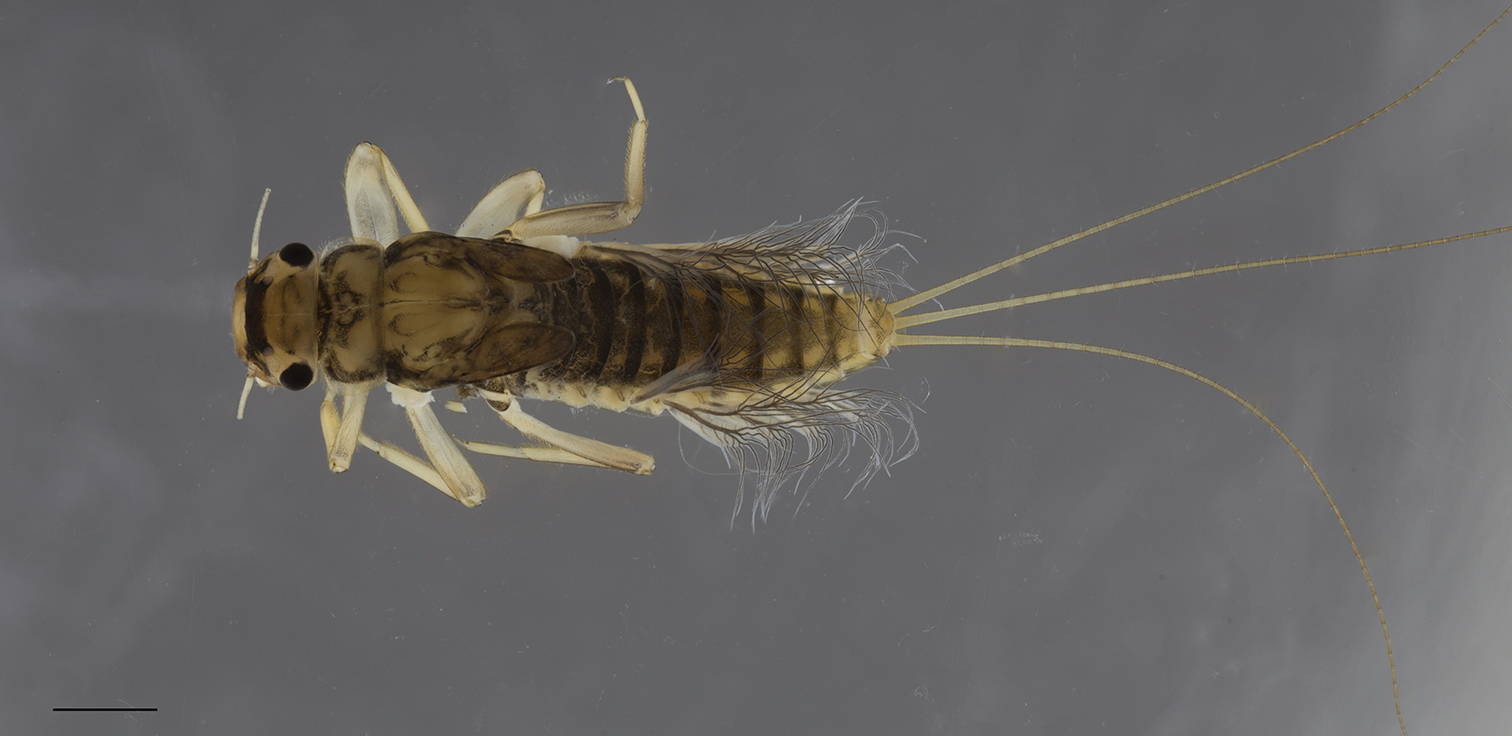
- Nymph of Habrophlebia djurdjurensis

Scientific classification
- Kingdom: Animalia
- Phylum: Arthropoda
- Clade: Pancrustacea
- Class: Insecta
- Order: Ephemeroptera
- Suborder: Furcatergalia
- Family: Leptophlebiidae; Banks, 1900

Genera
- Numerous, see text

= Leptophlebiidae =

Leptophlebiidae Temporal range: Barremian–Recent

Family of mayflies

Leptophlebiidae is a family belonging to the Ephemeropterans that are commonly known as the prong-gilled mayflies or leptophlebiids. It is the only family in the superfamily Leptophlebioidea. There are more than 650 described species of Leptophlebiids, which are easily recognized by the forked gills present on the larvae's abdomen, thus their common name.

== Larvae ==
Leptophlebiid larvae live in freshwater streams and lakes eating detritus and/or algae. North American species generally cling to rocks, few physiologically equipped for skilled swimming. Like all Ephemeropteran larvae, fragile gills line the lateral margins of their abdomen. Some genera grow mandibular tusks like their burrowing relatives, the Ephemeridae, Polymitarcyidae, and Potamanthidae.

== Genera ==
The Global Biodiversity Information Facility includes:

1. Acanthophlebia Towns, 1983
2. Adenophlebia Eaton, 1881
3. Adenophlebiodes Ulmer, 1924
4. Amoa (mayfly) Peters & Peters, 2000
5. Aprionyx Barnard, 1932
6. Arachnocolus Towns & Peters, 1979
7. Archethraulodes Pescador & Peters, 1982
8. Askola (mayfly) W.Peters, 1969
9. Atalomicria Harker, 1954
10. Atalonella Needham & Murphy, 1924
11. Atalophlebia Eaton, 1881
12. Atalophlebioides Phillips, 1930
13. Atopophlebia Flowers, 1980
14. Aupouriella Winterbourn, 2009
15. Aureophlebia Peters & Peters, 2000
16. Austroclima Towns & Peters, 1979
17. Austronella Towns & Peters, 1996
18. Austrophlebiodes Campbell & Suter, 1988
19. Barba (mayfly) Grant & Peters, 1993
20. Bessierus Thomas & Orth, 2000
21. Bibulmena Dean, 1987
22. Blasturophlebia Demoulin, 1968
23. Borinquena Traver, 1938
24. Calliarcys Eaton, 1881
25. Careospina Peters, 1971
26. Castanophlebia Barnard, 1932
27. Celiphlebia Peters & Peters, 1980
28. Ceylonula Kluge, Vasanth, Balasubramanian & Sivaramakrishnan, 2022
29. Chiusanophlebia Ueno, 1969
30. Choroterpes Eaton, 1881
31. Choroterpides Ulmer, 1939
32. Clavineta Sinitshenkova, 1991
33. Conovirilus McCafferty, 1997
34. Coula (mayfly) Peters & Peters, 1980
35. Cretoneta Chernova, 1971
36. Cryophlebia Towns & Peters, 1979
37. Cryptopenella Gillies, 1951
38. Dactylophlebia Pescador & Peters, 1980
39. Deanophlebia Finlay, 2019
40. Deleatidium Eaton, 1899
41. Demoulinellus Pescador & Peters, 1982
42. Dipterophlebiodes Demoulin, 1954
43. Ecuaphlebia Dominguez, 1988
44. Edmundsula Sivaramakrishnan, 1985
45. Euphyurus Bengtsson, 1909
46. Euthraulus Barnard, 1932
47. Farrodes Peters, 1971
48. Fasciamirus Peters, Peters & Edmunds, 1990
49. Fittkaulus Savage & Peters, 1978
50. Fulleta Navás, 1930
51. Fulletomimus Demoulin, 1956
52. Furvoneta Sinitshenkova, 1990
53. Garinjuga Campbell & Suter, 1988
54. Ghatula Kluge, Vasanth, Balasubramanian & Sivaramakrishnan, 2022
55. Gilliesia (mayfly) Peters & Edmunds, 1970
56. Gonserellus Pescador, 1997
57. Habroleptoides Schoenemund, 1929
58. Habrophlebia Eaton, 1881
59. Habrophlebiodes Ulmer, 19200
60. Hagenulites Staniczek, 2003
61. Hagenulodes Ulmer, 1924
62. Hagenulopsis Ulmer, 1919
63. Hagenulus Eaton, 1882
64. Hapsiphlebia Peters & Edmunds, 1972
65. Hermanella Needham & Murphy, 1924
66. Hermanellopsis Demoulin, 1955
67. Homothraulus Demoulin, 1955
68. Hubbardula Kluge, Vasanth, Balasubramanian & Sivaramakrishnan, 2022
69. Hyalophlebia Demoulin, 1955
70. Hydromastodon Polegatto & Batista, 2007
71. Hydrosmilodon Flowers & Domínguez, 1991
72. Hylister Dominguez & Flowers, 1989
73. Indialis Peters & Edmunds, 1970
74. Isca (mayfly) Gillies, 1951
75. Isothraulus Towns & Peters, 1979
76. Jappa Harker, 1954
77. Kachinophlebia Chen & Zheng, 2022
78. Kalbaybaria Campbell, 1993
79. Kaninga Dean, 2000
80. Kariona Peters & Peters, 1981
81. Kilariodes Sartori & Derleth, 2010
82. Kimminsula Peters & Edmunds, 1970
83. Kirrara Harker, 1954
84. Klugephlebia Selvakumar, Subramanian & Sivaramakrishnan
85. Koorrnonga Campbell & Suter, 1988
86. Kouma Peters, Peters & Edmunds, 1990
87. Leentvaaria Demoulin, 1966
88. Lepegenia Peters, Peters & Edmunds, 1978
89. Lepeorus Peters, Peters & Edmunds, 1978
90. Lepismophlebia Demoulin, 1968
91. Leptophlebia Westwood, 1840
92. Lisetta Thomas & Dominique, 2005
93. Litophlebia Hubbard & Riek, 1978
94. Loamaggalangta Dean, Forteath & Osborn, 1999
95. Magallanella Pescador & Peters, 1980
96. Magnilobus Grant & Peters, 1993
97. Maheathraulus Peters, Gillies & Edmunds, 1964
98. Mandreca Bello, 2000
99. Manggabora Dean & Suter, 2004
100. Marmenuera Dean, Forteath & Osborn, 2008
101. Massartella Lestage, 1930
102. Massartellopsis Demoulin, 1955
103. Mauiulus Towns & Peters, 1979
104. Megaglena Peters & Edmunds, 1970
105. Meridialaris Peters & Edmunds, 1972
106. Mesoneta Brauer, Redtenbacher & Ganglbauer, 1889
107. Microphlebia Savage & Peters, 1983
108. Miroculis Edmunds, 1963
109. Miroculitus Savage & Peters, 1983
110. Nathanella Demoulin, 1955
111. Neampia Peters & Mary, 2016
112. Neboissophlebia Dean, 1988
113. Needhamella Domínguez & Flowers, 1989
114. Neochoroterpes Allen, 1974
115. Neohagenulus Traver, 1938
116. Nesophlebia Peters & Edmunds, 1964
117. Ninadsa Özdikmen, 2008
118. Nonnullidens Grant & Peters, 1993
119. Notachalcus Peters & Peters, 1981
120. Notophlebia Peters & Edmunds, 1970
121. Nousia Navás, 1918
122. Nyungara Dean, 1987
123. Oumas Peters & Peters, 2000
124. Ounia Peters & Peters, 1981
125. Papposa Peters & Peters, 1981
126. Paraleptophlebia Lestage, 1917
127. Paraluma Peters & Peters, 2000
128. Paramaka Savage & Dominguez, 1992
129. Peloracantha Peters & Peters, 1980
130. Penaphlebia Peters & Edmunds, 1972
131. Perissophlebiodes Savage, 1983
132. Petersophlebia Demoulin, 1973
133. Petersula Sivaramakrishnan, 1984
134. Polythelais Demoulin, 1973
135. Poranga (mayfly) Gonçalves & Da-Silva, 2012
136. Poya (mayfly) Peters & Peters, 1980
137. Radima Akers, Peters & Peters, 2003
138. Rhigotopus Pescador & Peters, 1982
139. Riekophlebia Christidis, 2009
140. Sangpradubina Boonsoong, Boonsatien, Sartori, Michel, 2016
141. Secochela Pescador & Peters, 1982
142. Segesta (mayfly) Siegloch & Polegatto, 2006
143. Simothraulopsis Demoulin, 1966
144. Simothraulus Ulmer, 1939
145. Simulacala Peters, Peters & Edmunds, 1990
146. Siphangarus Sinitshenkova, 2000
147. Sulawesia Peters & Edmunds, 1989
148. Sulu (mayfly) Grant & Peters, 1993
149. Tenagophila Peters, Peters & Edmunds, 1994
150. Tepakia Towns & Peters, 1996
151. Terpides Demoulin, 1966
152. Thraulodes Ulmer, 1920
153. Thraulophlebia Demoulin, 1955
154. Thraulus Eaton, 18812
155. Thuringopteryx Kuhn, 1937
156. Tikuna Savage, Flowers & Porras, 2005
157. Tillyardophlebia Dean, 1997
158. Tindea Peters & Peters, 1980
159. Traverella Edmunds, 1948
160. Traverina Peters, 1971
161. Ulmeritis Traver, 1956
162. Ulmeritoides Traver, 1959
163. Ulmeritus Traver, 1956
164. Ulmerophlebia Demoulin, 1955
165. Xenophlebia Demoulin, 1968
166. Zephlebia Penniket, 1961

=== Extinct genera ===
- †Kachinophlebia Burmese amber, Myanmar, mid-Cretaceous (Albian-Cenomanian).
- †Crephlebia Burmese amber, Myanmar, mid-Cretaceous (Albian-Cenomanian).
- †Conovirilus Lebanese amber, Early Cretaceous (Barremian)

== See also ==
- List of mayflies of the British Isles
