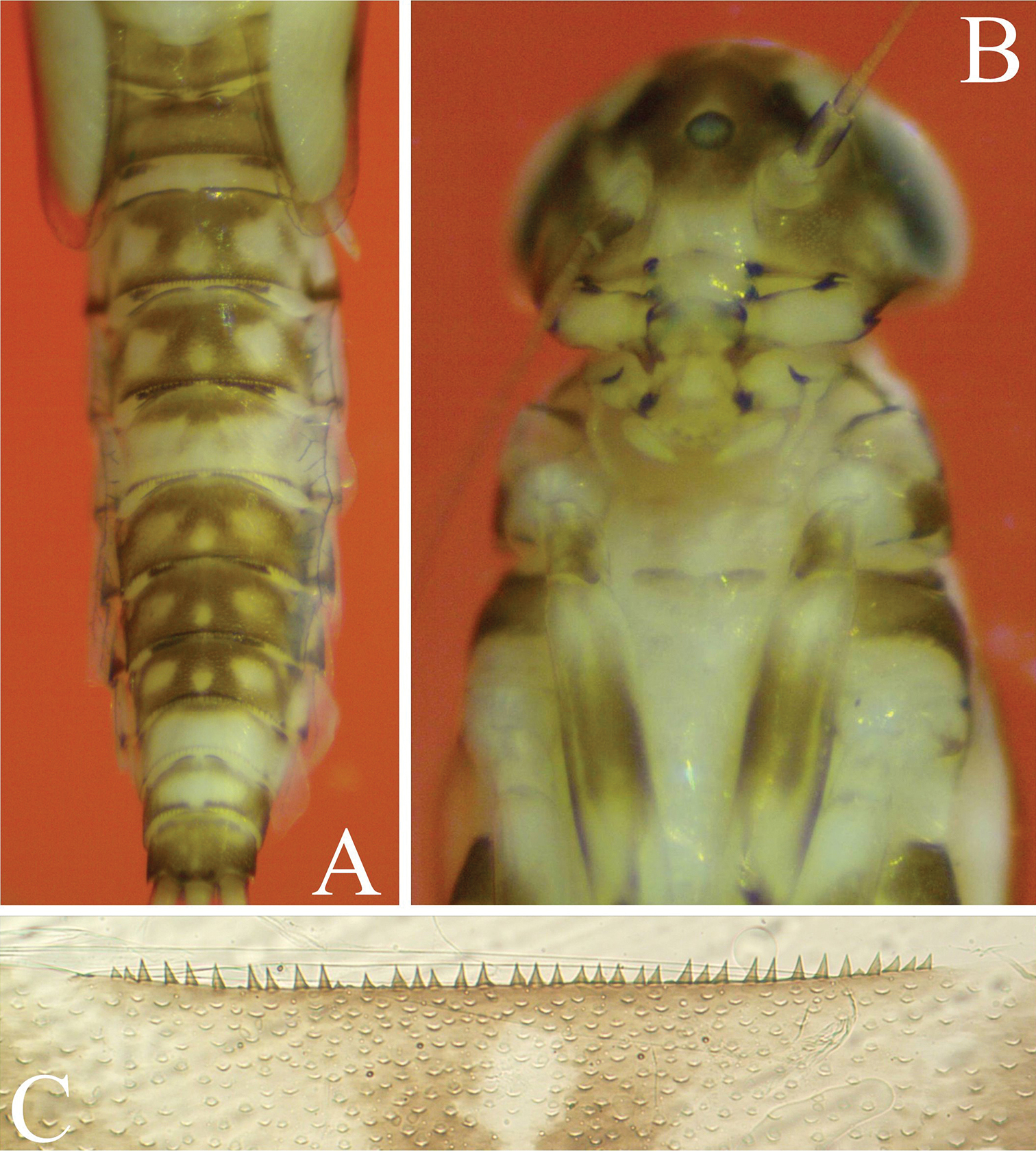

Scientific classification
- Domain: Eukaryota
- Kingdom: Animalia
- Phylum: Arthropoda
- Class: Insecta
- Order: Ephemeroptera
- Family: Baetidae
- Genus: Cloeodes
- Species: C. redactus

Binomial name
- Cloeodes redactus Waltz & McCafferty, 1987

= Cloeodes redactus =

Species of mayfly

Cloeodes redactus is a species of small minnow mayfly in the family Baetidae. It is found in Central America.
