= Cloeodes hydation =

Scientific classification
- Domain: Eukaryota
- Kingdom: Animalia
- Phylum: Arthropoda
- Class: Insecta
- Order: Ephemeroptera
- Family: Baetidae
- Genus: Cloeodes
- Species: C. hydation

Binomial name
- Cloeodes hydation McCafferty & Lugo-Ortiz, 1995

Species of mayfly

Cloeodes hydation is a species of small minnow mayfly in the family Baetidae.
