= Cloeodes binocularis =

Scientific classification
- Domain: Eukaryota
- Kingdom: Animalia
- Phylum: Arthropoda
- Class: Insecta
- Order: Ephemeroptera
- Family: Baetidae
- Genus: Cloeodes
- Species: C. binocularis

Binomial name
- Cloeodes binocularis (Needham & Murphy, 1924)

Species of mayfly

Cloeodes binocularis is a species of small minnow mayfly in the family Baetidae.
