= Cloeodes anduzei =

Scientific classification
- Domain: Eukaryota
- Kingdom: Animalia
- Phylum: Arthropoda
- Class: Insecta
- Order: Ephemeroptera
- Family: Baetidae
- Genus: Cloeodes
- Species: C. anduzei

Binomial name
- Cloeodes anduzei (Traver, 1943)

Species of mayfly

Cloeodes anduzei is a species of small minnow mayfly in the family Baetidae.
