= Cloeodes irvingi =

Scientific classification
- Domain: Eukaryota
- Kingdom: Animalia
- Phylum: Arthropoda
- Class: Insecta
- Order: Ephemeroptera
- Family: Baetidae
- Genus: Cloeodes
- Species: C. irvingi

Binomial name
- Cloeodes irvingi Waltz & McCafferty, 1987

Species of mayfly

Cloeodes irvingi is a species of small minnow mayfly in the family Baetidae.
