= Cloeodes =

Scientific classification
- Domain: Eukaryota
- Kingdom: Animalia
- Phylum: Arthropoda
- Class: Insecta
- Order: Ephemeroptera
- Family: Baetidae
- Subfamily: Baetinae
- Genus: Cloeodes; Traver, 1938

Genus of mayflies

Cloeodes is a genus of mayflies in the family Baetidae.

== Species ==
BioLib and GBIF include:

1. Cloeodes anduzei (Traver, 1943)
2. Cloeodes auwe Salles & Batista, 2004
3. Cloeodes aymara (Traver, 1971)
4. Cloeodes aymore Massariol & Salles, 2011
5. Cloeodes barituensis Nieto & Richard, 2008
6. Cloeodes bicoloratus Gattolliat, 2001
7. Cloeodes binocularis (Needham & Murphy, 1924)
8. Cloeodes espinillo Nieto & Richard, 2008
9. Cloeodes excogitatus Waltz & McCafferty, 1987
10. Cloeodes freitagae Gattolliat, 2001
11. Cloeodes fustipalpus Lugo-Ortiz & McCafferty, 1998
12. Cloeodes hydation McCafferty & Lugo-Ortiz, 1995
13. Cloeodes illiesi Lugo-Ortiz & McCafferty, 1998
14. Cloeodes itajara Massariol & Salles, 2011
15. Cloeodes inzingae (Crass, 1947)
16. Cloeodes irvingi Waltz & McCafferty, 1987
17. Cloeodes incus Waltz & McCafferty, 1987
18. Cloeodes jaragua Salles & Lugo-Ortiz, 2003
19. Cloeodes longisetosus (Braasch & Soldán, 1980)
20. Cloeodes macrolamellus Waltz & McCafferty, 1987
21. Cloeodes maculipes Traver
22. Cloeodes nocturnus (Navás, 1922)
23. Cloeodes opacus Nieto & Richard, 2008
24. Cloeodes penai (Morihara & Edmunds, 1980)
25. Cloeodes peninsulus Waltz & McCafferty, 1987
26. Cloeodes portabilis Lugo-Ortiz & McCafferty, 1999
27. Cloeodes pseudogladius Gattolliat, 2001
28. Cloeodes redactus Waltz & McCafferty, 1987
29. Cloeodes stelzneri (Weyenbergh, 1883)
30. Cloeodes turbinops (Needham & Murphy, 1924)
31. Cloeodes venezuelensis (Traver, 1943)
32. Cloeodes waltzi Wiersema & Baumgardner, 2000
