= Cloeodes aymore =

Scientific classification
- Domain: Eukaryota
- Kingdom: Animalia
- Phylum: Arthropoda
- Class: Insecta
- Order: Ephemeroptera
- Family: Baetidae
- Genus: Cloeodes
- Species: C. aymore

Binomial name
- Cloeodes aymore Massariol & Salles, 2011

Species of mayfly

Cloeodes aymore is a species of small minnow mayfly in the family Baetidae.
