= Fallceon =

Scientific classification
- Domain: Eukaryota
- Kingdom: Animalia
- Phylum: Arthropoda
- Class: Insecta
- Order: Ephemeroptera
- Family: Baetidae
- Genus: Fallceon; Waltz & McCafferty, 1987

Genus of mayflies

Fallceon is a genus of blue-winged olives in the family of mayflies called Baetidae. There are about 19 described species in Fallceon.

== Species ==
These 19 species belong to the genus Fallceon:

- Fallceon alcarrazae (Kluge, 1992)^{c g}
- Fallceon ater Hofmann & Thomas, 1999^{c g}
- Fallceon eatoni (Kimmins, 1934)^{i c g}
- Fallceon fortipalpus Lugo-Ortiz and McCafferty, 1994^{i c g}
- Fallceon garcianus (Traver, 1938)^{c g}
- Fallceon grandis González-Lazo and Salles, 2007^{i c g}
- Fallceon inops (Navás, 1912)^{c g}
- Fallceon longifolius (Kluge, 1992)^{i c g}
- Fallceon murphyae (Hubbard, 1976)^{c g}
- Fallceon nikitai McCafferty & Lugo-Ortiz, 1994^{c g}
- Fallceon planifrons (Kluge, 1992)^{i c g}
- Fallceon poeyi (Eaton, 1885)^{c g}
- Fallceon quilleri (Dodds, 1923)^{i c g b}
- Fallceon sageae McCafferty, 2008^{i c g}
- Fallceon sextus (Kluge, 1992)^{c g}
- Fallceon sonora (Allen and Murvosh, 1987)^{i g}
- Fallceon testudineus (Kluge, 1992)^{c g}
- Fallceon thermophilos (McDunnough, 1926)^{i c g}
- Fallceon yaro (Traver, 1971)^{c g}

Data sources: i = ITIS, c = Catalogue of Life, g = GBIF, b = Bugguide.net
