= Fallceon quilleri =

Scientific classification
- Domain: Eukaryota
- Kingdom: Animalia
- Phylum: Arthropoda
- Class: Insecta
- Order: Ephemeroptera
- Family: Baetidae
- Genus: Fallceon
- Species: F. quilleri

Binomial name
- Fallceon quilleri (Dodds, 1923)

Synonyms
- Baetis buenoi Allen, 1985; Baetis byblis Allen and Murvosh, 1983; Baetis cleptis Burks, 1953; Baetis endymion Traver, 1935; Baetis erebus Traver, 1935; Baetis leechi Day, 1954; Baetis quilleri Dodds, 1923; Fallceon buenoi (Allen, 1985); Fallceon byblis (Allen and Murvosh, 1983)

Species of mayfly

Fallceon quilleri is a species of small minnow mayfly in the family Baetidae. It is found in Central America and North America. In North America its range includes the south half of Canada, all of Mexico, and the continental United States.
