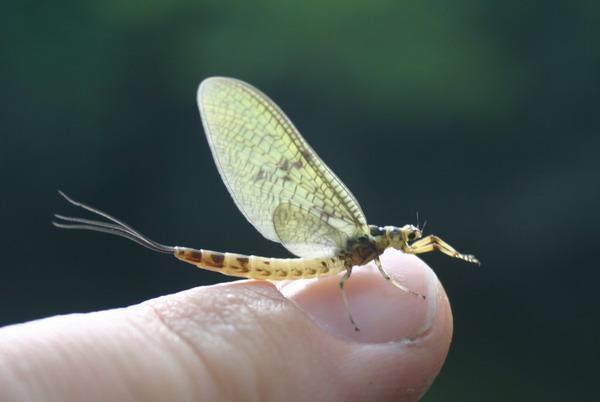
- Ephemera danica

Scientific classification
- Kingdom: Animalia
- Phylum: Arthropoda
- Clade: Pancrustacea
- Class: Insecta
- Order: Ephemeroptera
- Suborder: Schistonota
- Superfamily: Ephemeroidea

= Ephemeroidea =

Superfamily of mayflies

Ephemeroidea is a superfamily of mayflies. Members of this superfamily are found in most parts of the world with the exception of the Arctic, the Antarctic and Australia.

== Families ==
Six families are currently recognised by the Catalogue Of Life:

- Behningiidae Motas & Bacesco, 1937 – 7 species
  - Behningia Lestage, 1930 – 4 species
  - Dolania Edmunds & Traver, 1959 – 1 species
  - Protobehningia Chernova, 1960 – 2 species
- Ephemeridae Latreille, 1810 – 90 species
  - Afromera Demoulin, 1955 – 6 species
  - Eatonica Navás, 1913 – 6 species
  - Eatonigenia Ulmer, 1939 – 7 species
  - Ephemera Linnaeus, 1758 – 59 species
  - Hexagenia Walsh, 1863 – 8 species
  - Litobrancha McCafferty, 1971 – 1 species
  - Pentagenia Walsh, 1863 – 2 species
  - Phthartus Handlirsch, 1904 – 1 species
- Euthyplociidae Lestage, 1921 – 23 species
  - Afroplocia Lestage, 1939 – 1 species
  - Campylocia Needham & Murphy, 1924 – 4 species
  - Dasyplocia Gonçalves, Pescador & Peters, 2020 – 1 species
  - Euthyplocia Eaton, 1871 – 2 species
  - Exeuthyplocia Lestage, 1919 – 1 species
  - Mesoplocia – 2 species
  - Polyplocia Lestage, 1921 – 4 species
  - Proboscidoplocia Demoulin, 1966 – 8 species
- Palingeniidae Albarda, 1888 – 37 species
  - Anagenesia Eaton, 1883 – 15 species
  - Chankagenesia – 3 species
  - Cheirogenesia Demoulin, 1952 – 3 species
  - Mortogenesia Lestage, 1923 – 1 species
  - Palingenia Burmeister, 1839 – 11 species
  - Plethogenesia Ulmer, 1920 – 4 species
- Polymitarcyidae Banks, 1900 – 117 species
  - Asthenopus Eaton, 1871 – 8 species
  - Campsurus Eaton, 1868 – 65 species
  - Ephoron Williamson, 1802 – 15 species
  - Languidipes – 3 species
  - Povilla Navás, 1912 – 7 species
  - Tortopsis Molineri, 2010 – 12 species
  - Tortopus Needham & Murphy, 1924 – 7 species
- Potamanthidae Klapalek, 1909 – 26 species
  - Anthopotamus McCafferty & Bae, 1990 – 4 species
  - Potamanthus Pictet, 1845 – 13 species
  - Rhoenanthus Eaton, 1881 – 9 species
