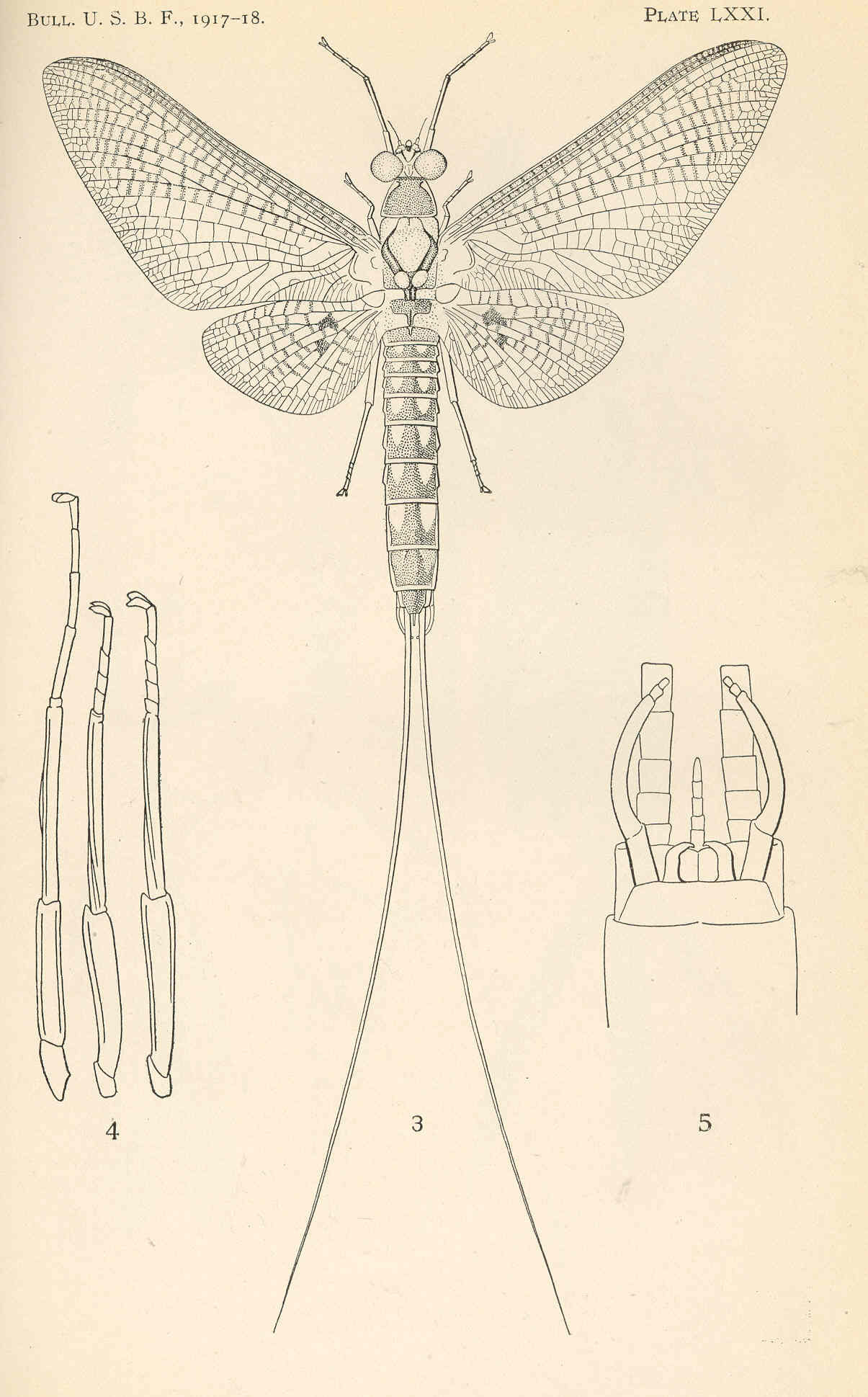

Scientific classification
- Domain: Eukaryota
- Kingdom: Animalia
- Phylum: Arthropoda
- Class: Insecta
- Order: Ephemeroptera
- Family: Ephemeridae
- Genus: Hexagenia
- Species: H. bilineata

Binomial name
- Hexagenia bilineata (Say, 1824)

Synonyms
- Baetis bilineata Say, 1824; Palingenia bilineata (Say, 1824)

= Hexagenia bilineata =

Species of mayfly

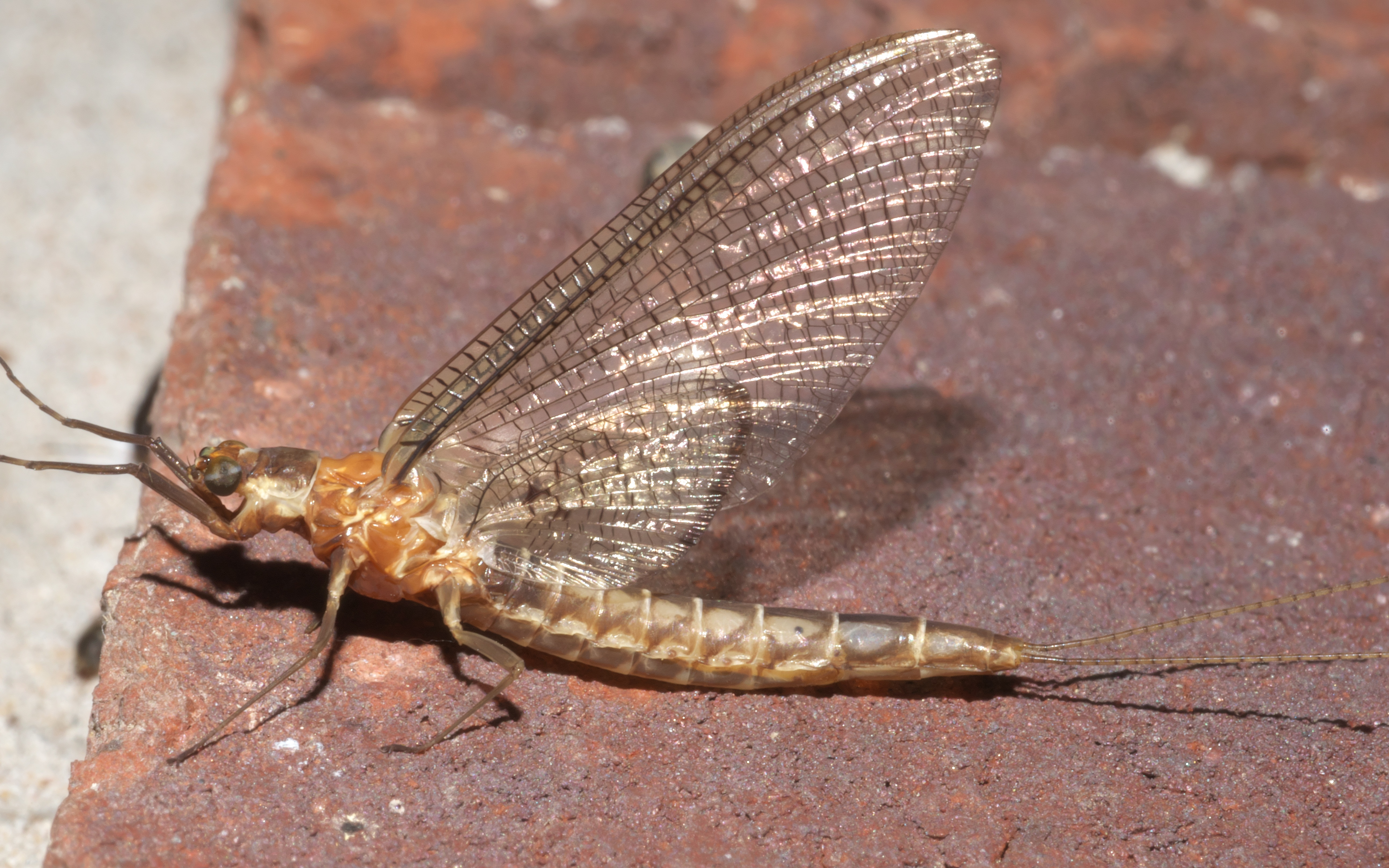
Hexagenia bilineata, Oklahoma

Hexagenia bilineata is a species of mayfly in the family Ephemeridae. It is native to North America where it is found in the Upper Mississippi Valley. Sometimes adults of this mayfly are so abundant as to cause a nuisance because of their enormous numbers. The larvae are aquatic and burrow in mud and the adult insects have brief lives.

== Description ==
When the adults are ready to emerge, the mayfly nymphs (larvae) swim to the surface of the water during the night. Their skin splits and winged subimagos struggle free, usually in less than a minute, and fly to nearby trees to rest. They are a dull gray color and have short, coarse legs, bristly cerci and cloudy, grayish wings. Some eight to eighteen hours later, these subimagos moult into mature adults (imagos). These are altogether more delicate in appearance than the subimagos; the wings are transparent, the legs are longer and more slender, the cerci lack bristles, the eyes are larger and the body is patterned in brown and cream. The females are much larger than the males.

== Distribution and habitat ==
Hexagenia bilineata occurs in the Upper Mississippi Valley. Adults appear in summer and are found near still and slow-moving water. The nymphs are found burrowing in the mud and silt in shallow lakes and slow-moving streams and rivers. This mayfly is generally more abundant than the closely related Hexagenia limbata, but that species becomes more plentiful from Keokuk, Iowa northwards. When a lock was drained near Keokuk in July 1958, 344 nymphs of H. bilineata were found in 10.5 square feet (1 m^{2}) of sediment.

== Ecology ==
Around dusk, male imagos congregate in swarms. They often aggregate in the lee of structures such as buildings or trees, or if there is no wind, all round such a structure. Each male occupies a fixed position facing into the wind, about one foot (30 cm) from the next one, stabilizing its position with its cerci. They do not bob up and down as do males of H. limbata. Any female which flies into a swarm is pursued by males until copulation takes place in the air. The male then returns to the swarm, all the members of which will die before morning. The female deposits two packets, each containing several thousand eggs, into the water where they sink to the bottom and stick to the mud. She dies soon afterwards, and any undeposited egg packets may be extruded from her corpse. Each egg hatches a few weeks later and the newly hatched nymph tunnels into the mud and makes a U-shaped burrow. It creates a water current through the burrow which provides it with the oxygen it needs, and from which it filters the organic detritus on which it feeds. It remains in this burrow until it is ready to emerge the following year.

This mayfly may have a shorter life cycle than other members of its genus. In the laboratory when kept at a warm temperature it has been reared from egg to adulthood in thirteen weeks, but in the Keokuk area there is believed to be a single generation per year, whereas in Kentucky Lake there is mixed voltinism, with some adults emerging at 14 months and others at 22 months.

== Human impact ==
Sometimes H. bilineata adults emerge simultaneously in vast numbers. On July 14, 1958, The Des Moines Register reported that the previous evening:

Fish flies controlled the Dubuque Bridge [at Dubuque, Iowa] for 40 minutes, then surrendered with heavy losses under an armored counter attack by highway commission scraper-trucks.

Riverside trees on which the insects roosted lost branches, houses were covered, visibility was reduced, and many insects were conveyed hundreds of miles on towboats that were pulling barges on the river. The crews of the riverboats called them "those big, black bastards".

On the evening of July 23, 2014 in the La Crosse, Wisconsin area, the insects were airborne in such large numbers that they were detectable on weather radar, the enormous swarm resembling a rainstorm. They are attracted to lights, and their bodies pile up in yards, on roadways and bridges. A triple vehicle accident injuring two people was reported in nearby Trenton, believed to be caused by the slippery conditions caused by the green slime from the squashed corpses.
