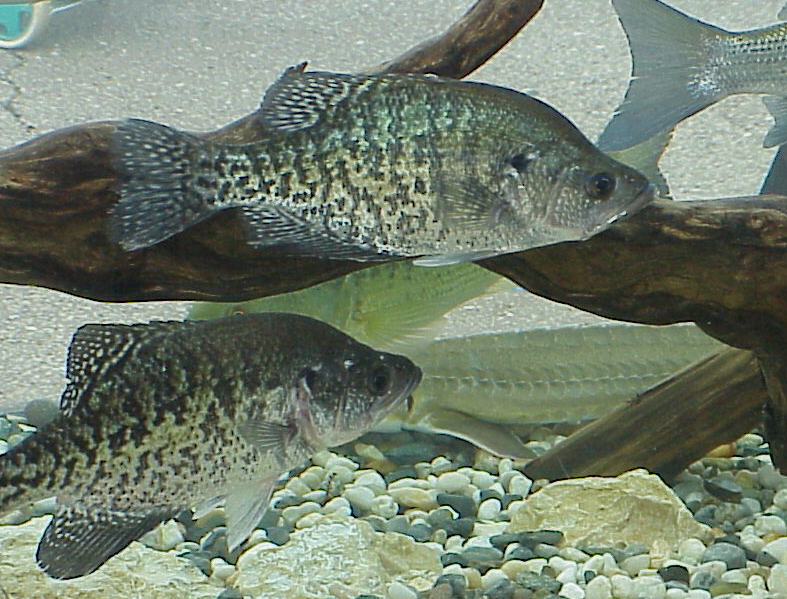

Conservation status
- Least Concern (IUCN 3.1)

- Secure (NatureServe)

Scientific classification
- Kingdom: Animalia
- Phylum: Chordata
- Class: Actinopterygii
- Division: Teleostei
- Order: Centrarchiformes
- Family: Centrarchidae
- Genus: Pomoxis
- Species: P. annularis

Binomial name
- Pomoxis annularis Rafinesque, 1818
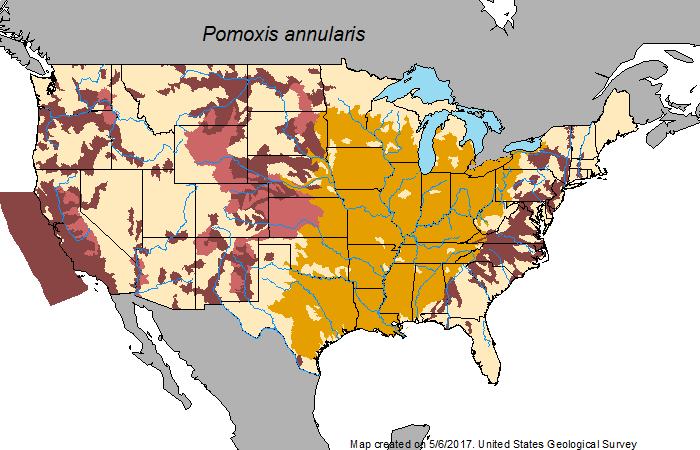
- Distribution map of the white crappie. Yellow represents native and purple represents where it has been introduced.

Synonyms
- Cichla storeria Kirtland, 1838; Pomoxis nitidus Girard, 1858; Pomoxys brevicauda Gill, 1865; Pomoxys intermedius Gill, 1865; Pomoxys protacanthus Gill, 1865

= White crappie =

Species of fish

The white crappie (Pomoxis annularis) is a freshwater fish found in North America, one of the two species of crappies. Alternate common names for the species include goldring, silver perch, white perch and sac-a-lait. USS Goldring is named for the fish. The genus name Pomoxis refers to crappies' sharp operculum, while the species name annularis means 'having rings', i.e., it has vaguely vertical bars on the body.

== Description ==
In Iowa

White crappies are morphologically similar to black crappies (Pomoxis nigromaculatus). They have 5–10 dark vertical bars along their bodies, rather than randomly scattered spots like those of the black crappie. The white crappie has a silvery color with green or brown shades along its back, with dark lateral bars along its side, and a white belly. The dorsal fins of the white crappie start farther back on the body than those of the black crappie. The anal fin is about the same size as the dorsal fin. The white crappie has six dorsal fin spines, whereas the black crappie has seven or eight dorsal fin spines. White crappies are also slightly more elongated than black crappies. The white crappie is a deep-bodied fish with a flattened body, or a depth that is one-third of the length of the fish. White crappies have spinous rays and ctenoid fish scales found in advanced teleosts. The exposed part of the scale has tiny tooth-like projections (cteni). Both species of crappies have a terminal mouth position with many small, conical teeth in two rows along the mouth, which are called cardiform because they resemble a tool used for wool carding. Crappies belong to the family Centrarchidae in the order Perciformes within class Actinopterygii.

The white crappie rarely exceeds 2 pounds (0.91 kg), and typically lives 2–7 years. The species is generally about 9–10 inches (23–25 cm) in length as an adult. The current International Game Fish Association all-tackle world record for a white crappie is 2.35 kg (5.2 lb), caught on July 31, 1957, near Enid Dam, Mississippi, by angler Fred Bright, while the IGFA all-tackle length world record is a 39-centimetre (15 in) fish, caught on October 14, 2022, in Grenada Lake, Mississippi, by angler Doug Borries.

== Distribution ==
White crappies are native to the Great Lakes, Hudson Bay, and the Mississippi River basins expanding from New York and southern Ontario westward to South Dakota and southward to Texas. This species has a large geographic range in the United States and currently has a stable population. Currently, this species is listed as a least concern species for conservation efforts.

== Habitat ==
White crappies can be found in large rivers, reservoirs, and lakes. White crappies are more tolerant of turbid (murky) waters than black crappies, and the white crappie usually outnumbers the black crappie in turbid waters. White crappies also generally outnumber black crappies in areas with little rooted aquatic vegetation. White crappies are most commonly found in rivers and low-velocity areas such as pools and backwaters of rivers. They are most abundant in lakes and reservoirs larger than 5 acres. The white crappie can be found in the open water during the mornings and evenings, but during the day this species is found in shallower, quiet waters (6–12 feet (1.8–3.7 m) deep) surrounded by structure.

== Reproduction ==
White crappies spawn in May and June when the water temperature reaches 56 °F (13 °C). Males construct nests by creating small, bowl-shaped depressions on the bottom around brush, rocks, and logs in the shallow water. During the spawning season, males develop dark coloration on their throats. Females lay 5,000 to 30,000 eggs. The males guard these nests until the fry swim away. Males guard these nests because it helps ensure the success of their genes being passed on to the next generation. The white crappie typically grows 3–5 inches (7.6–12.7 cm) within the first year of its life and can grow an additional 3–4 inches in the second year. The white crappies reach maturity around their second or third year. The maximum lifespan of white crappies is 8 to 10 years with the average lifespan being 3 to 4 years in unmanaged waters and 6 years in managed waters.

== Diet ==
White crappies are neither cruise- nor ambush-feeding strategists. Instead, they swim intermittently and only search for prey when stationary. This strategy is considered saltatory, or pause-and-travel search. Using this strategy, juveniles can grow rapidly in the first few days of life. This strategy is energetically favored to reduce search time for the species. White crappies in the larval and juvenile stages of life eat zooplankton and continue to feed primarily on small invertebrates during their first year of life.

When white crappies reach a length of 12–15 centimetres (4.7–5.9 in), they are considered adult. The adults feed mainly on small fish such as minnows and young American shad, and large invertebrates such as crayfish and hellgrammites. Their diet can vary depending on their location. They feed the most in June through October. In the spring, they feed moderately, with their activity slowing during the winter months. In Mississippi, they feed on mayflies such as Hexagenia atrocaudata and Pentagenia vittigera. In Illinois, and probably elsewhere, they feast on American gizzard shad. In Pennsylvania and Ohio, adults eat small common carp, yellow perch, bluegill, and other white crappies. The terminal mouth position, sometimes known as the normal position, allows for this species to feed on what is in front of it.
