= Green Drake =

The common name Green Drake refers to one of several species of mayflies.

- Ephemera danica
- Ephemera guttulata or the Eastern Green Drake.
