= Pentagenia robusta =

Conservation status
- Extinct (IUCN 3.1)

Scientific classification
- Kingdom: Animalia
- Phylum: Arthropoda
- Clade: Pancrustacea
- Class: Insecta
- Order: Ephemeroptera
- Family: Palingeniidae
- Genus: Pentagenia
- Species: †P. robusta

Binomial name
- †Pentagenia robusta McDunnough, 1926

Synonyms
- Pantagenia robusta McDunnough, 1926 [orth. error]

Extinct species of mayfly

Pentagenia robusta, the robust burrowing mayfly, is a recently extinct species of mayfly in the family Ephemeridae. It was endemic to the United States, found in the states Indiana, Kentucky, and Ohio.

It was known only from the Ohio River area and it was not described until 1926. This riverine species was probably sensitive to changes in river flow and water quality, especially increasing sedimentation as are many closely related species.
