= Hexagenia orlando =

Scientific classification
- Domain: Eukaryota
- Kingdom: Animalia
- Phylum: Arthropoda
- Class: Insecta
- Order: Ephemeroptera
- Family: Ephemeridae
- Genus: Hexagenia
- Species: H. orlando

Binomial name
- Hexagenia orlando Traver, 1931

Species of mayfly

Hexagenia orlando is a species of common burrower mayfly in the family Ephemeridae. It is found in North America.
