= Ephemera blanda =

Scientific classification
- Domain: Eukaryota
- Kingdom: Animalia
- Phylum: Arthropoda
- Class: Insecta
- Order: Ephemeroptera
- Family: Ephemeridae
- Genus: Ephemera
- Species: E. blanda

Binomial name
- Ephemera blanda Traver, 1932

Synonyms
- Ephemera triplex Traver, 1935

Species of mayfly

Ephemera blanda is a species of common burrower mayfly in the family Ephemeridae. It is found in southeastern Canada and the southeastern United States.
