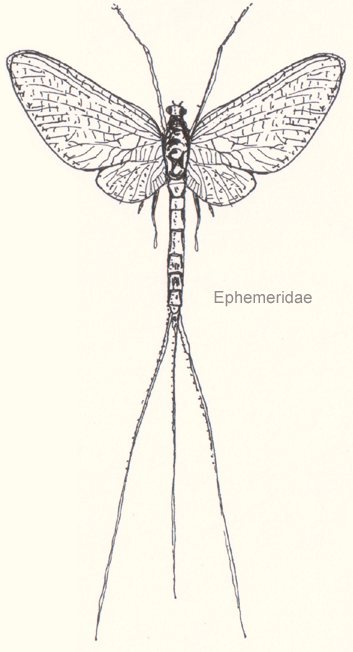
- Ephemeridae-sp

Scientific classification
- Kingdom: Animalia
- Phylum: Arthropoda
- Class: Insecta
- Order: Ephemeroptera
- Family: Palingeniidae
- Genus: Pentagenia; Walsh, 1863

= Pentagenia =

Genus of mayflies

Pentagenia, similar to Hexagenia, is a genus of insect in the family Ephemeridae, commonly referred to as burrowing mayflies.

== General information ==
Unlike Hexagenia, which inhabit mostly lightly compacted silt substrates, most species of Pentagenia inhabit compacted clay substrates. They also prefer faster flowing streams than Hexagenia. This difference in habitat creates several morphological differences between the two genera. The mandibular tusks are used to excavate an open burrow in the substrate where the mayfly resides, therefore the size and strength of the head differs between the two genera in correlation to the different substrates in which they burrow. However, the best delineating feature between the two is that Pentagenia have a pointed frontal process with a minor cleft at the point.

== Species ==
These two species belong to the genus Pentagenia:

- †Pentagenia robusta McDunnough, 1926^{i c g}
- Pentagenia vittigera (Walsh, 1862)^{i c g b}

Data sources: i = ITIS, c = Catalogue of Life, g = GBIF, b = Bugguide.net
