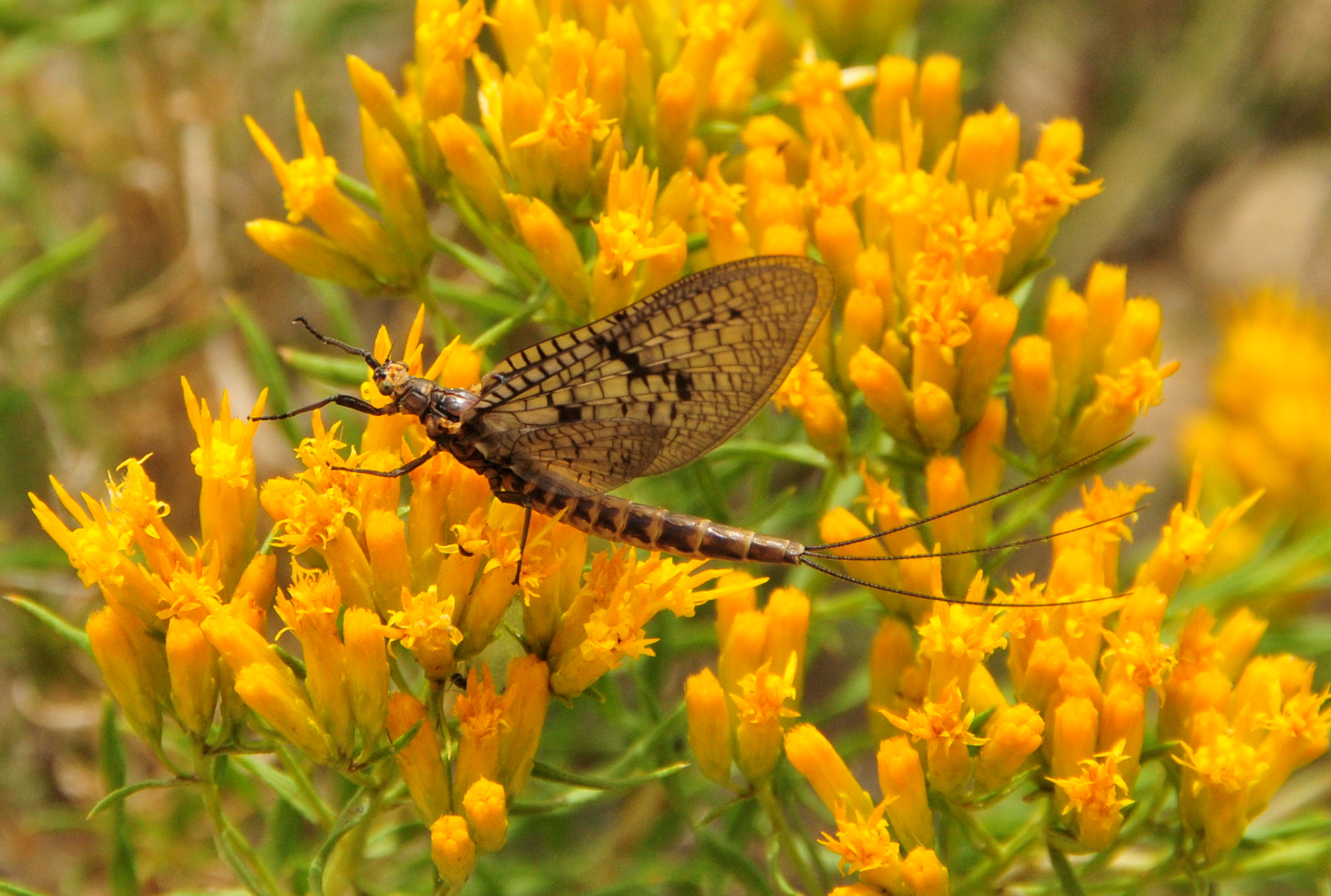
- Imago on rubber rabbitbrush

Scientific classification
- Domain: Eukaryota
- Kingdom: Animalia
- Phylum: Arthropoda
- Class: Insecta
- Order: Ephemeroptera
- Family: Ephemeridae
- Genus: Ephemera
- Species: E. simulans

Binomial name
- Ephemera simulans Walker, 1853

= Ephemera simulans =

Species of mayfly

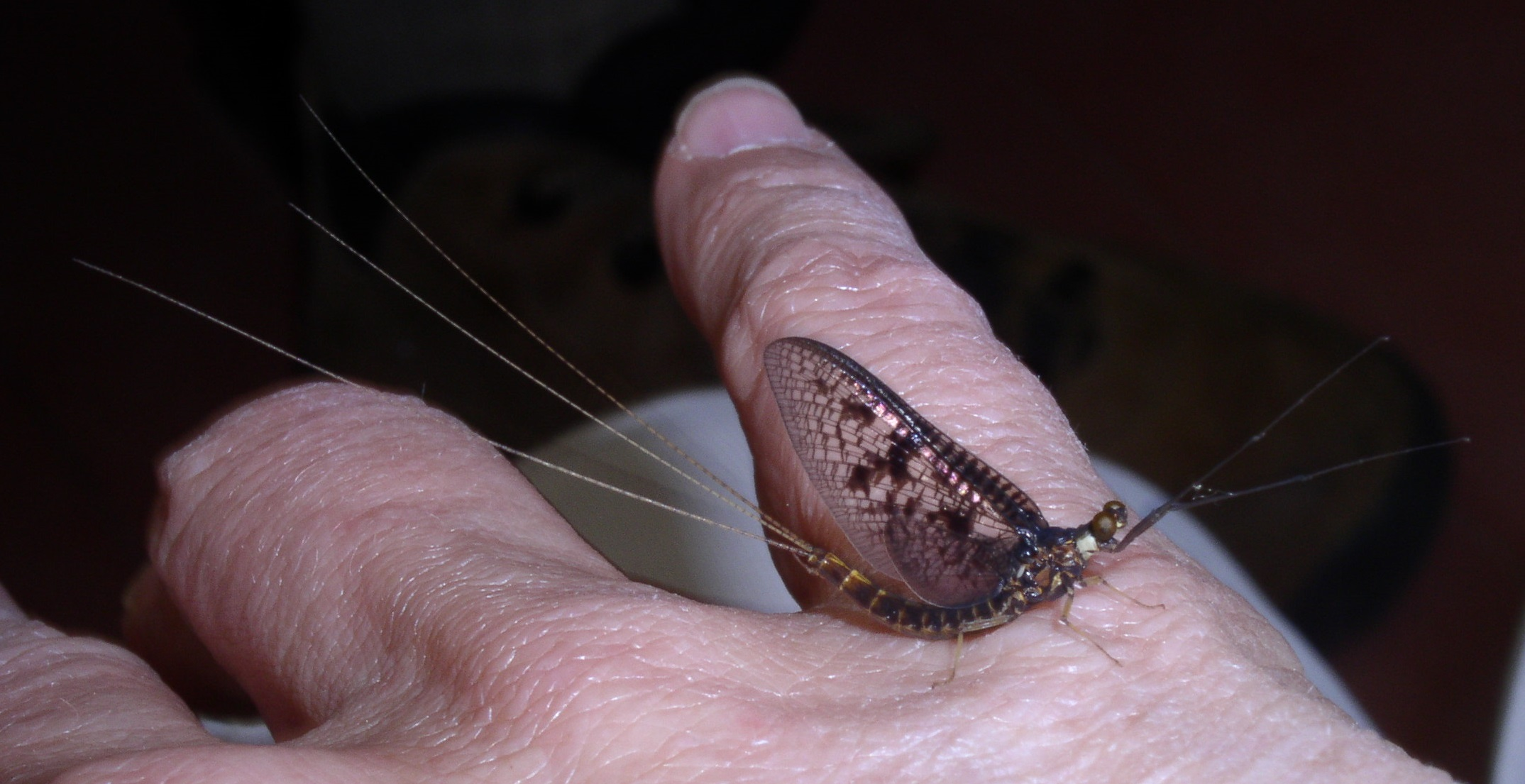
Ephemera simulans male

Ephemera simulans is a species of mayfly. It is commonly found throughout the United States. The species is used for fly fishing.

== Habitat ==
The mayfly can be found throughout the United States in the Rockies, Midwest, and in the Great Lakes region. Out of all the mayfly species in the family Ephemeridae, they are the most common in North America. The nymphs of the species burrow and can be found the same time as the Green Drake (Ephemera guttulata) mayflies, which the species acts similar to; if one trout stream has a hatch of E. simulans, there might also be a hatch of E. guttulata. The mayfly hatches annually at Skaneateles Lake, where fly fishermen arrive from Central New York and further to fish at.

== Mating ==
It has been observed that the species have their wings upright after mating, which fish tend to eat while ignoring the mayflies that have outstretched wings. Both hatching and mating occur at night. It hatches from mid-June to mid-July and the nymphs emerge from the sand and silt bottoms of streams where trout are. When the nymphs emerge, they ride on the water until they can fly away to the foliage that is nearby. During this process, the nymphs are easily susceptible to being eaten by trout.

== Fly fishing ==
They are used for fly fishing. Artificial nymphs of the species can be used for fishing, including the Wiggle Nymph, Marabou Nymph, and Feather Duster nymph. When using an artificial fly of its adult stage, the silhouette and presentation are more important than it being the same color. It is referred to as Brown Drake, but so is the species Hexagenia atrocaudata. Trout, bass, perch, rock bass, Atlantic Salmon, and bullheads feed on the mayflies. They are considered "nationally important on many of the country's best trout streams".
