= Ephemera annandalei =

Scientific classification
- Domain: Eukaryota
- Kingdom: Animalia
- Phylum: Arthropoda
- Class: Insecta
- Order: Ephemeroptera
- Family: Ephemeridae
- Genus: Ephemera
- Species: E. annandalei

Binomial name
- Ephemera annandalei Chopra, 1937

Species of mayfly

Ephemera annandalei is a species of burrowing mayfly in the family Ephemeridae.
