= Ephemera compar =

Scientific classification
- Domain: Eukaryota
- Kingdom: Animalia
- Phylum: Arthropoda
- Class: Insecta
- Order: Ephemeroptera
- Family: Ephemeridae
- Genus: Ephemera
- Species: E. compar

Binomial name
- Ephemera compar Hagen, 1875

Species of mayfly

Most likely, Ephemera compar is an extinct species of burrowing mayfly in the family Ephemeridae. It was found in North America. Ephemera compar is known from a single specimen, collected from the "foothills of Colorado" in 1873, but despite intensive surveys of the Colorado mayflies reported in 1984, it has not been rediscovered.
