= Denina =

Scientific classification
- Domain: Eukaryota
- Kingdom: Animalia
- Phylum: Arthropoda
- Class: Insecta
- Order: Ephemeroptera
- Family: Ephemeridae
- Genus: Denina; McCafferty, 1987
- Species: D. dubiloca

Binomial name
- Denina dubiloca McCafferty, 1987

Genus of mayflies

Denina is a monotypic genus of European mayflies in the family Ephemeridae, erected by McCafferty in 1987, containing the species Denina dubiloca McCafferty, 1987.
