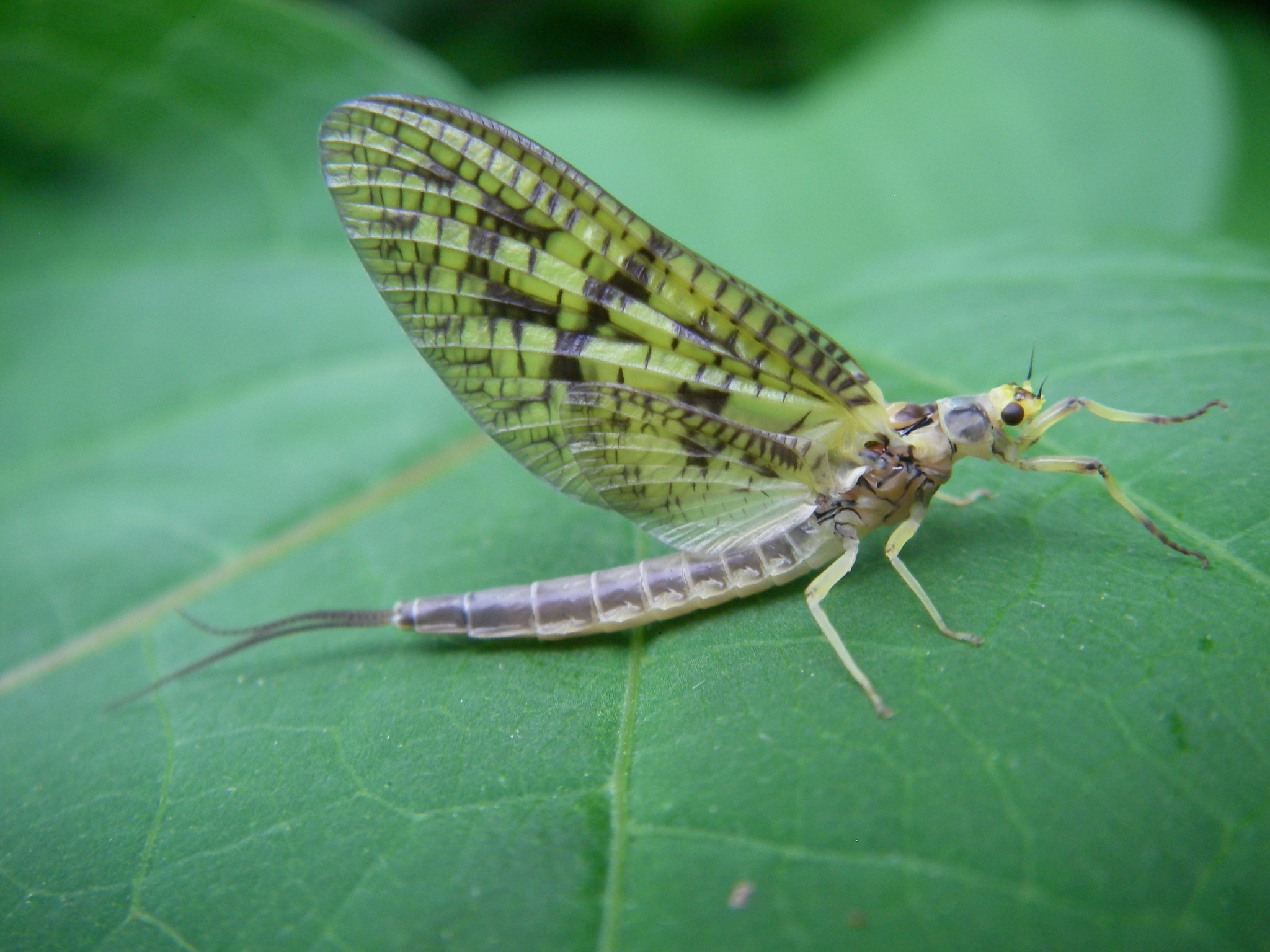
- Adult

Scientific classification
- Domain: Eukaryota
- Kingdom: Animalia
- Phylum: Arthropoda
- Class: Insecta
- Order: Ephemeroptera
- Family: Ephemeridae
- Genus: Ephemera
- Species: E. guttulata

Binomial name
- Ephemera guttulata Pictet, 1843

= Ephemera guttulata =

Eastern green drake

Species of mayfly

Ephemera guttulata, commonly known as the eastern green drake, shad fly and coffinfly, is a species of mayfly in the genus Ephemera. The eastern green drake is native to the continental United States and Canada. Its conservation status per the NatureServe conservation status ranking system is G5, meaning it is secure.

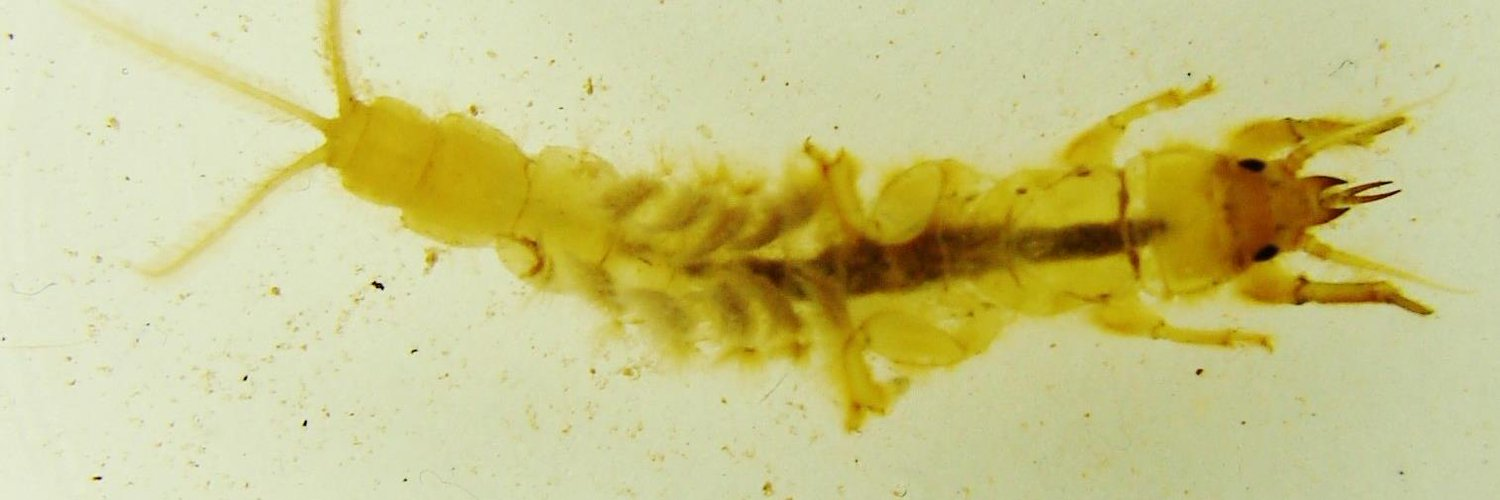
Green drake larva

== Range ==
This species is endemic to the eastern seaboard of the United States and Canada, ranging no further west than Ontario and Arkansas.

== Reproductive cycle ==
Like all mayflies, eastern green drakes have a fully aquatic larval stage. This is followed by a phase of a flying sexually immature adult called the subimago. Finally, there is a short-lived sexually mature adult stage (imago).
