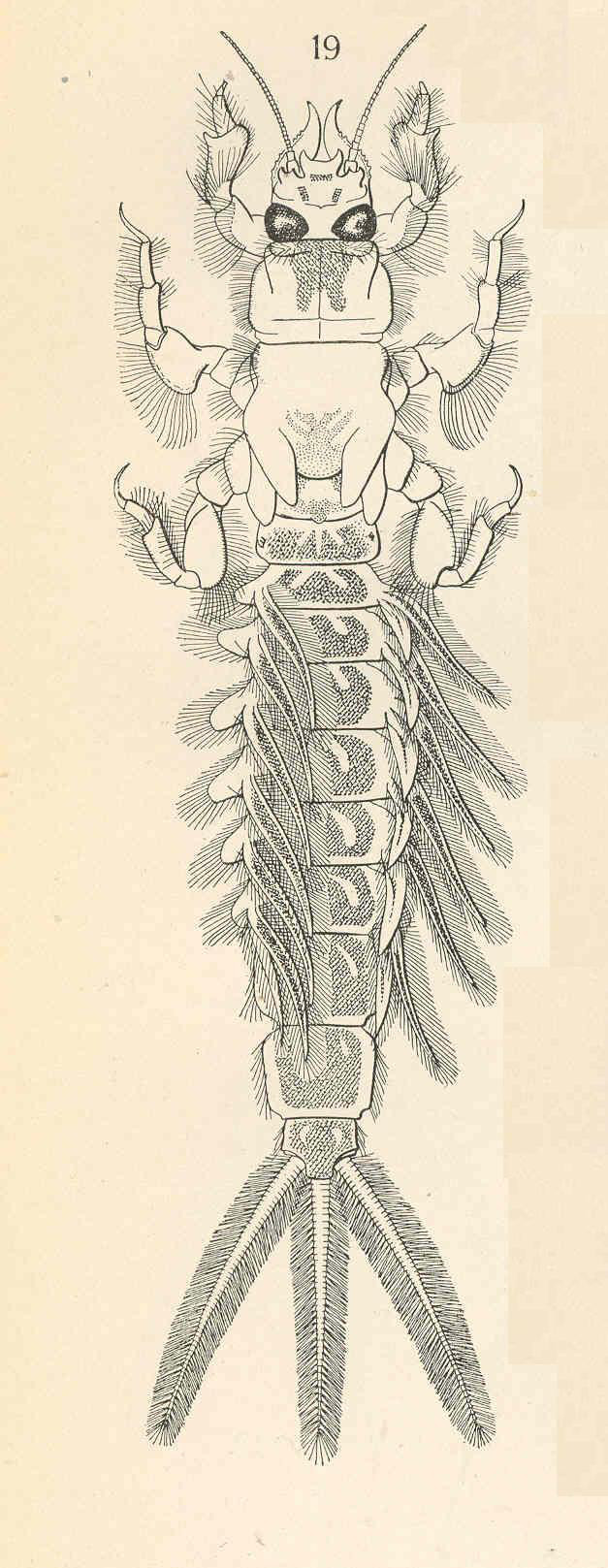
- Pentagenia vittigera Walsh; Nymph from above, with the gills on the right pushed aside to show the markings of the abdomen

Scientific classification
- Domain: Eukaryota
- Kingdom: Animalia
- Phylum: Arthropoda
- Class: Insecta
- Order: Ephemeroptera
- Family: Palingeniidae
- Genus: Pentagenia
- Species: P. vittigera

Binomial name
- Pentagenia vittigera (Walsh, 1862)

Synonyms
- Palingenia vittigera Walsh, 1862; Pentagenia quadripunctata Walsh, 1863

= Pentagenia vittigera =

Species of mayfly

Pentagenia vittigera is a species of riverbed burrower mayfly in the family Palingeniidae. It is found in North America.
