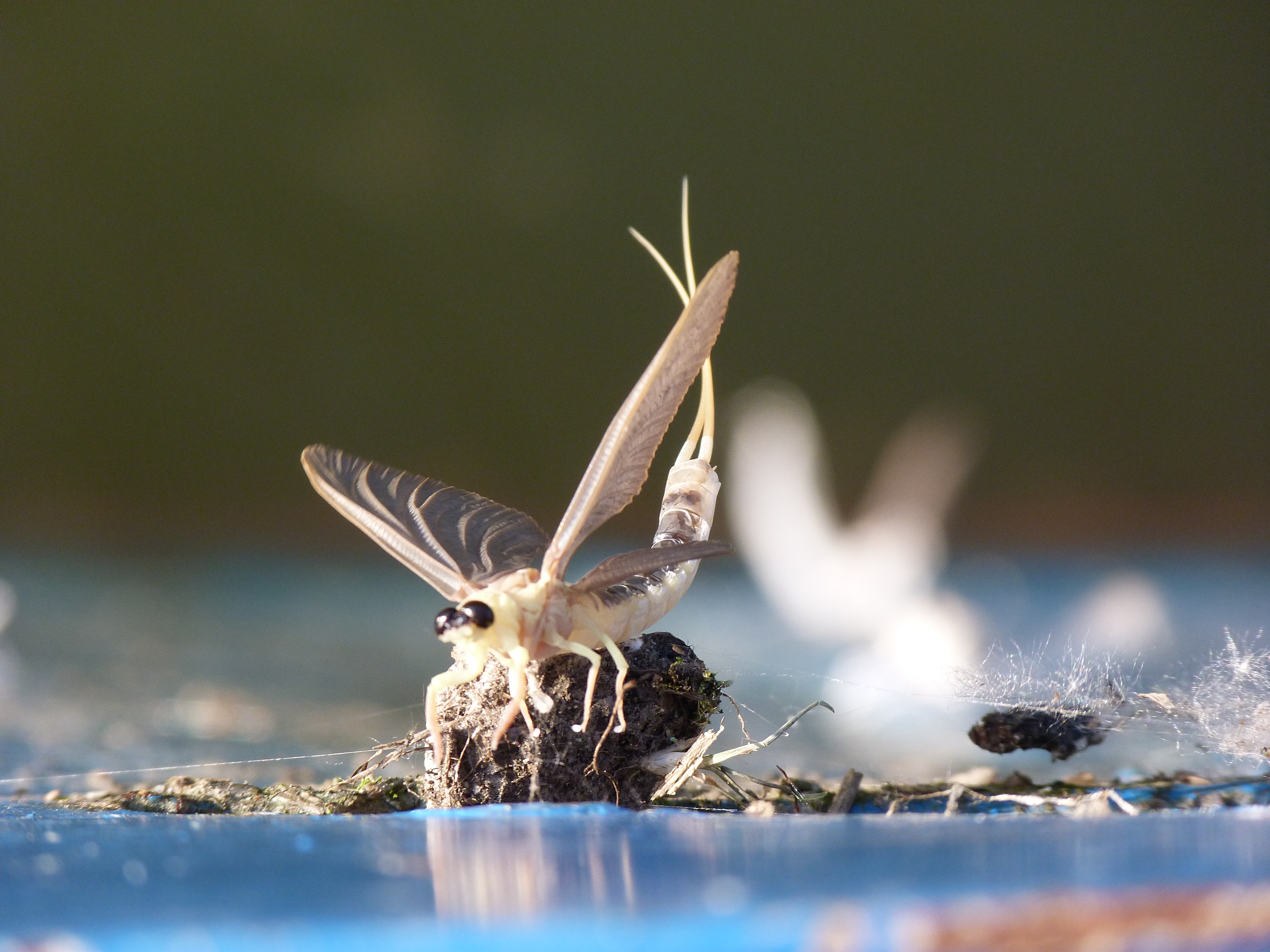

Scientific classification
- Kingdom: Animalia
- Phylum: Arthropoda
- Class: Insecta
- Order: Ephemeroptera
- Family: Palingeniidae
- Genus: Palingenia
- Species: P. longicauda

Binomial name
- Palingenia longicauda Olivier, 1791

= Palingenia longicauda =

Species of mayfly

Palingenia longicauda is an aquatic insect in the order Ephemeroptera. It is known as the Tisa or Tisza mayfly after the European Tisza river where it is found and also as the long-tailed mayfly and giant mayfly since it is the largest mayfly species in Europe, measuring 12 cm (4.7 in) from head to tail.

Unlike many other species of mayflies, adult P. longicauda never move away from water; they fly low and their cerci are frequently touching or sweeping the surface. The slow-moving river and absence of surface-feeding fish help make this possible. The presence of P. longicauda is an indicator of clean unpolluted water. Now extinct in many European countries, it can be found on the Tisza river (in Slovakia, Serbia and Hungary), on the Prut and Bega (in Romania) and on Ukrina (in Bosnia and Herzegovina).

== Mating ==
Large numbers of P. longicauda larvae will usually hatch and mature during a week in mid June; this natural phenomenon is known as the 'blooming of the Tisza' or 'Tisza blooming' and is a tourist attraction. (In Hungarian, the native name of the P. longicauda is tiszavirág, i.e. "Tisza blossom".) After hatching the adults only have a few hours to mate before they die. Consequently, groups of males will frantically try to mate with a female. Females will fly 1–3 km before laying their eggs on the river, which then sink to the bottom and hatch after about 45 days. The larvae develop in the mud for as long as three years before hatching. Larvae live in tunnels in the mud at a density of 400 tunnels per square metre.
