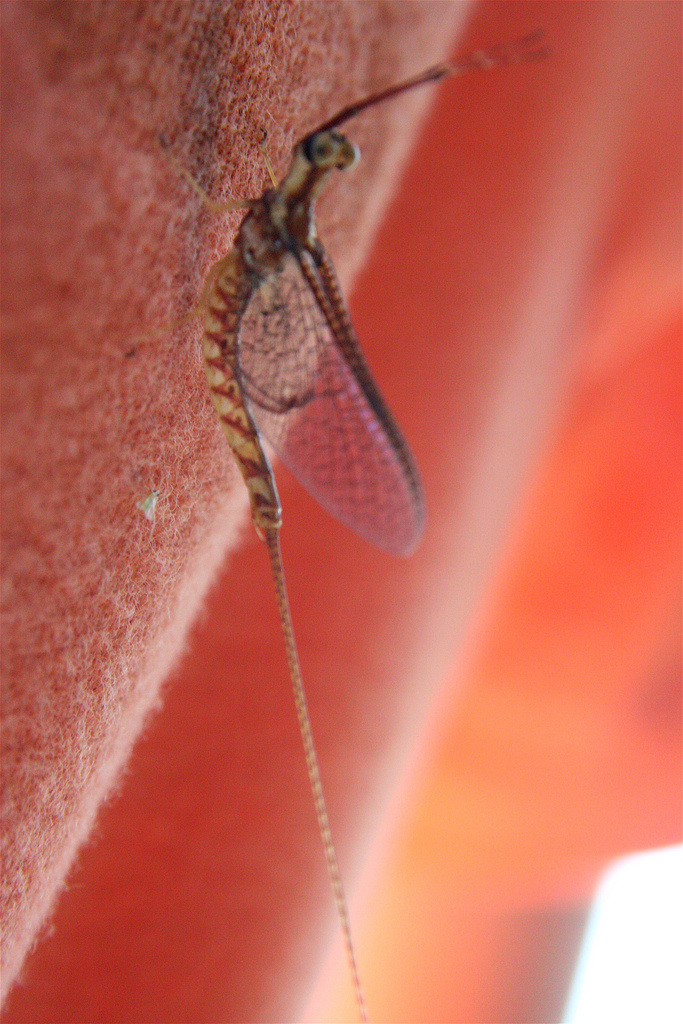

Scientific classification
- Kingdom: Animalia
- Phylum: Arthropoda
- Clade: Pancrustacea
- Class: Insecta
- Order: Ephemeroptera
- Family: Ephemeridae
- Genus: Hexagenia
- Species: H. limbata

Binomial name
- Hexagenia limbata (Serville, 1829)

= Hexagenia limbata =

Species of mayfly

Hexagenia limbata, the giant mayfly, is a species of mayfly in the family Ephemeridae. It is native to North America where it is distributed widely near lakes and slow-moving rivers. The larvae, known as nymphs, are aquatic and burrow in mud and the adult insects have brief lives. They are often referred to as fish flies around the Great Lakes as they tend to cause the areas around water to smell like rotten fish.

It's also called the golden mayfly, big Michigan mayfly and great leadwing drake.

== Description ==
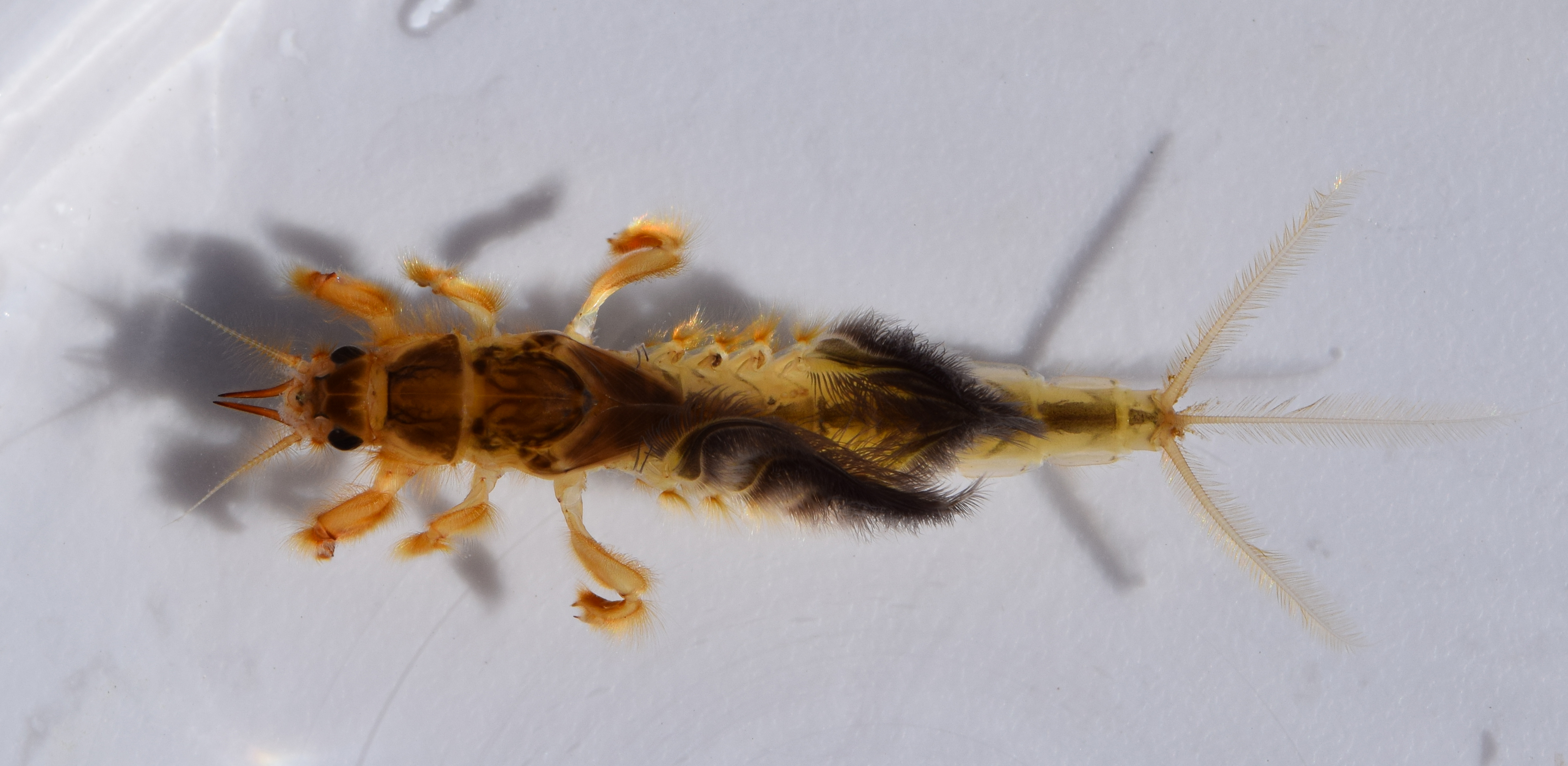
Nymph

The mature adult stage of Hexagenia limbata can be as much as 27 mm (1.1 in) long. The females tend to be slightly larger than the males but have smaller eyes. The forewings are long and membranous while the hind wings are much smaller and have dark margins. The tip of the abdomen bears two long cerci or tails. When the insect is at rest, the wings are folded vertically above the back. The color and body markings are somewhat variable but this insect is usually some shade of yellow, pale brown or white.

== Distribution and habitat ==
Hexagenia limbata is the most widely distributed mayfly in North America. It is known from most of Canada and all the states in the United States except Alaska and Arizona. It is at its most common in the Great Lakes region. Its habitat is lakes and slow-moving rivers with muddy bottoms in which the nymphs can burrow. Adults can be found congregating in swarms near the water or resting in vegetation.

Due to lake pollution, H. limbata was not observed on the U.S. side of Lake Erie between 1953 and the early 1990s.

== Ecology ==
The female lays eggs in the water which sink to the bottom. They may hatch fairly soon, but many overwinter as eggs and hatch in the spring. The newly hatched nymph is about 1 mm (0.04 in) long. It has a long, roughly cylindrical body and passes through up to thirty molts during its development. It has tusks on its mandibles with which it can dig, three pairs of legs, developing wingpads in later growth stages, and three elongated tails. It lives in a U-shaped burrow which it excavates in the mud, and has seven pairs of feathery gills on its abdomen with which it wafts water through its burrow to increase aeration. In cold northern lakes, it may take two years to develop, but in canals in the south of the United States, this may be reduced to as little as seventeen weeks.

When the fully developed nymph rises to the surface to emerge as an adult, it first enters a subimago stage. This is similar in appearance to the adult, but has cloudy rather than clear wings and lacks functional genitalia. After a period of one to three days, the subimago flies to a resting place where it molts one more time, becoming a sexually mature adult form, the imago.

Subimago and adult mayflies do not have functioning mouthparts and do not eat; the nymphs are mainly detritivores, feeding on organic particles that are moved into their burrows by the current of water caused by their constantly beating gills. In their nymphal state, they are preyed on by dragonfly nymphs which attack them in their burrows. Mayfly nymphs do not normally emerge from these tunnels until they are fully developed, at which time they swim to the surface, their skins split, and they emerge as subimagos and fly off. At this time they are very attractive to predators and are eaten by various species of fish, by dragonflies, and by birds.

The emergence, known to fisherman as the "hatch", can be highly synchronized, resulting in a massive emergence. This is thought to enable a higher probability of finding a mate. The mayflies can be attracted to human lighting at night, resulting in swarms at gas stations, etc. In some cases, car lights attract swarms on bridges, which can result in the road becoming slippery. In some cases, the hatch shows up on weather radar. The hatching is not strictly simultaneous in a region, but does exhibit a notable peak emergence
