= Behningia =

Scientific classification
- Domain: Eukaryota
- Kingdom: Animalia
- Phylum: Arthropoda
- Class: Insecta
- Order: Ephemeroptera
- Family: Behningiidae
- Genus: Behningia; Lestage, 1930

Genus of mayflies

Behningia is a genus of sand-burrowing mayfly in the family Behningiidae. There are at least four described species in Behningia.

== Species ==
These four species belong to the genus Behningia:

- Behningia baei McCafferty & Jacobus, 2006
- Behningia nujiangensis Zhou & Bisset, 2019
- Behningia tschernovae Edmunds & Traver, 1959
- Behningia ulmeri Lestage, 1929
