= Behningiidae =

Scientific classification
- Kingdom: Animalia
- Phylum: Arthropoda
- Clade: Pancrustacea
- Class: Insecta
- Order: Ephemeroptera
- Suborder: Furcatergalia
- Family: Behningiidae; Motas & Bacesco, 1937

Genera
- See text

Family of mayflies

Behningiidae is a family of mayflies. It is a primitive family; the nymphs burrow in the sediment but lack tusks on their mandibles, and the forelegs are not modified for burrowing. The gills are ventral, and the ones on the first abdominal segment are single and are longer than the gills on the other segments. The forelegs are palp-like and the other two pairs of legs are modified to protect the gills. The family is holarctic in distribution. The genus Dolania occurs in North America and the other three genera occur in northern Europe and Asia.

== Genera ==
The family includes the following genera:

- †Archaeobehningia Tshernova, 1977
- Behningia Lestage, 1930
- Dolania Edmunds & Traver, 1959
- Protobehningia Tshernova & Bajkova, 1960
