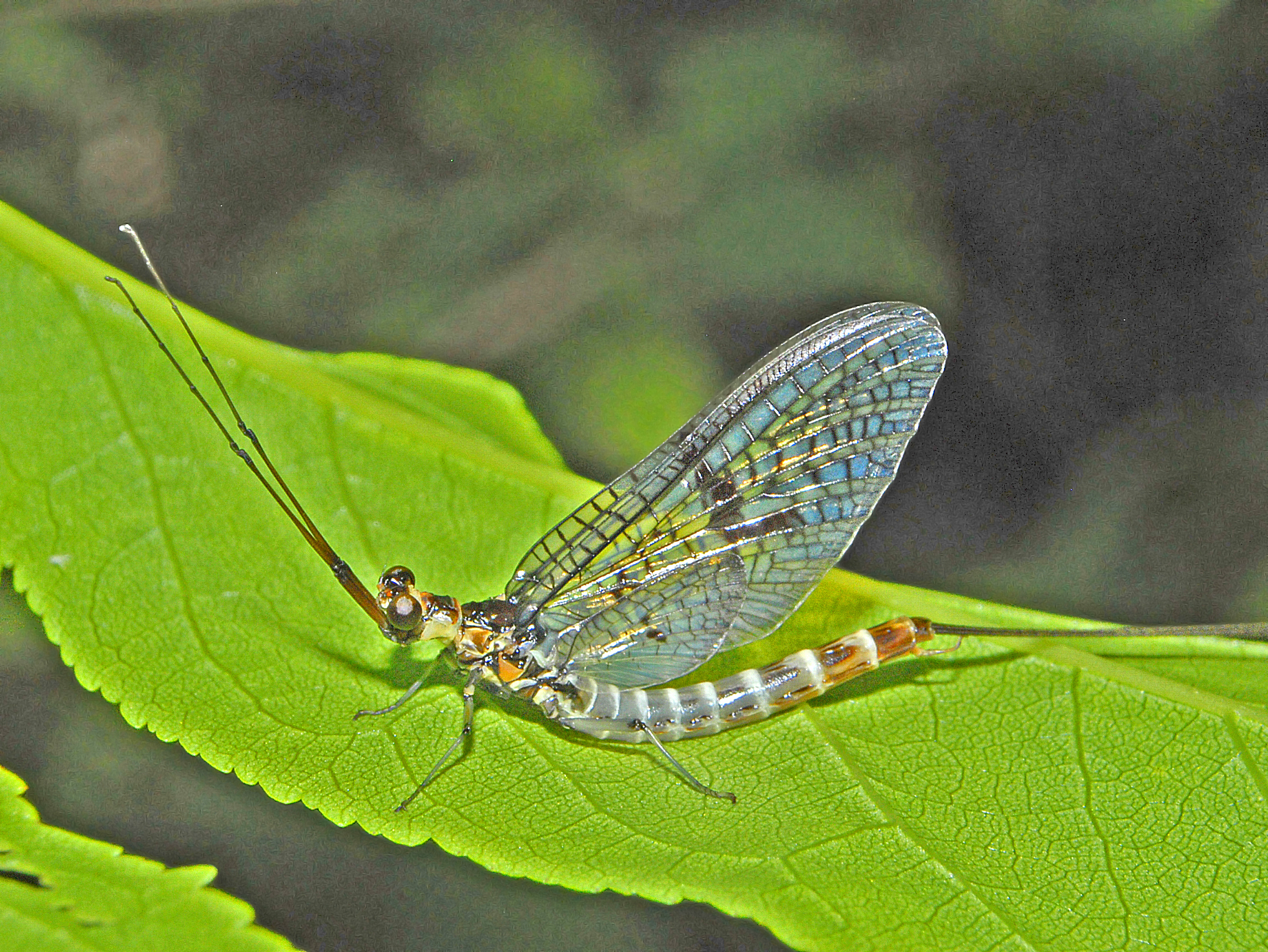
- Ephemera danica
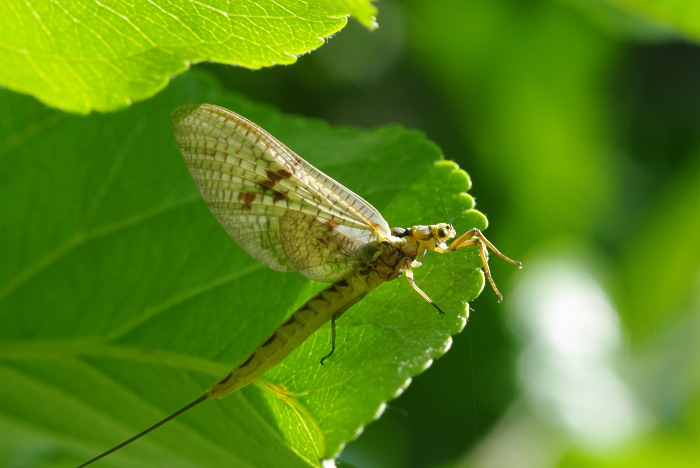
- Ephemera vulgata

Scientific classification
- Kingdom: Animalia
- Phylum: Arthropoda
- Class: Insecta
- Order: Ephemeroptera
- Family: Ephemeridae
- Genus: Ephemera; Linnaeus, 1758

= Ephemera (mayfly) =

Genus of mayflies

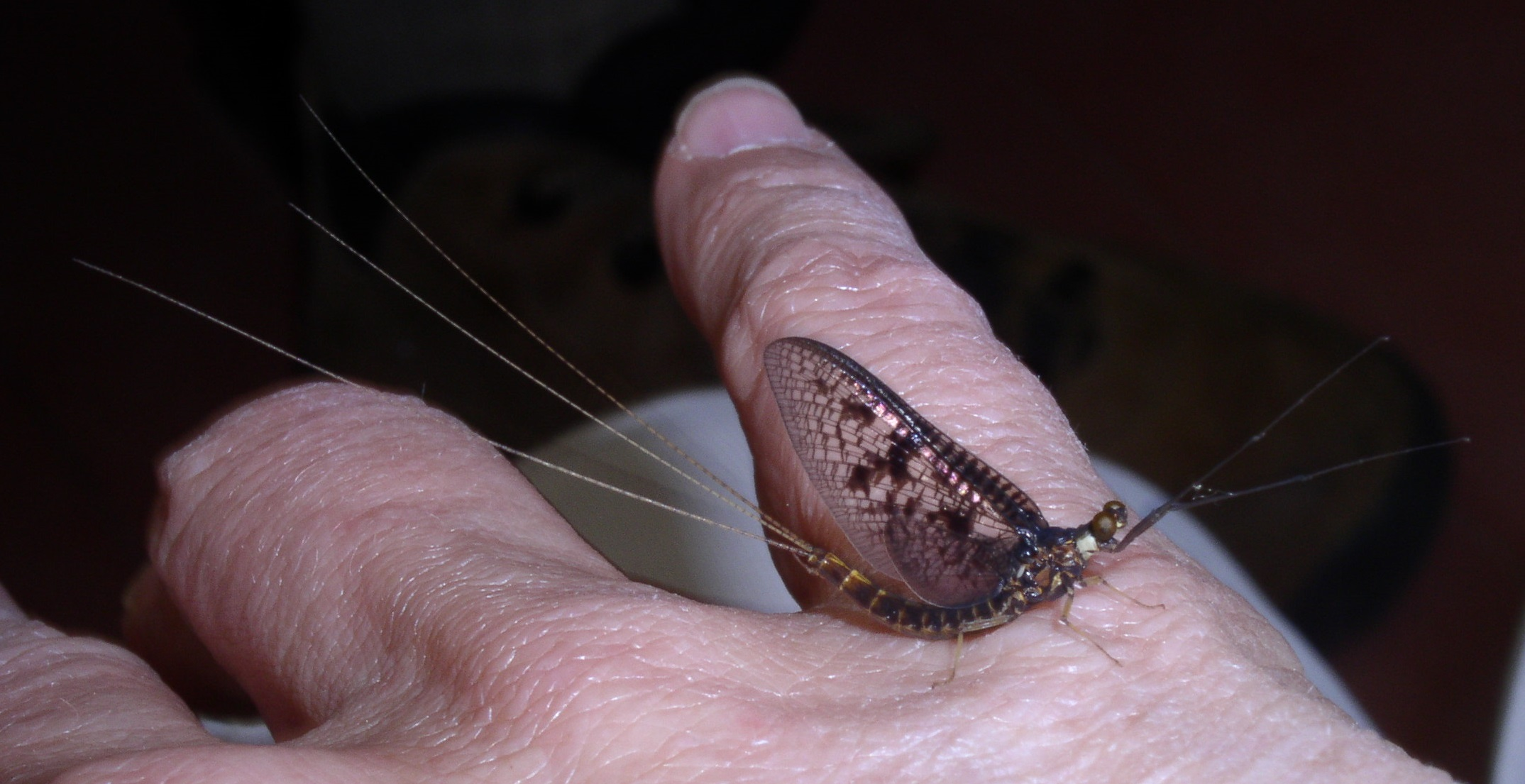
Ephemera simulans male

Ephemera is a genus of mayfly in the family Ephemeridae. It contains the following species:

- Ephemera annandalei
- Ephemera blanda
- Ephemera brunnea
- Ephemera compar
- Ephemera consors
- Ephemera danica
- Ephemera diffusa
- Ephemera distincta
- Ephemera duporti
- Ephemera expectans
- Ephemera formosana
- Ephemera fulvata
- Ephemera glaucops
- Ephemera guttulata
- Ephemera hainanensis
- Ephemera hasalakensis
- Ephemera hellenica
- Ephemera hongjiangensis
- Ephemera immaculata
- Ephemera jianfengensis
- Ephemera kirinensis
- Ephemera lankensis
- Ephemera lineata
- Ephemera mccaffertyi
- Ephemera mooiana
- Ephemera nadinae
- Ephemera nathani
- Ephemera orientalis
- Ephemera parnassiana
- Ephemera postica
- Ephemera pramodi
- Ephemera pulcherrima
- Ephemera purpurata
- Ephemera remensa
- Ephemera romantzovi
- Ephemera rufomaculata
- Ephemera sachalinensis
- Ephemera sauteri
- Ephemera serica
- Ephemera simulans
- Ephemera soanica
- Ephemera spilosa
- Ephemera supposita
- Ephemera transbajkalica
- Ephemera traverae
- Ephemera varia
- Ephemera vulgata
- Ephemera wanquanensis
- Ephemera wuchowensis
- Ephemera yaoshani
- Ephemera zettana
