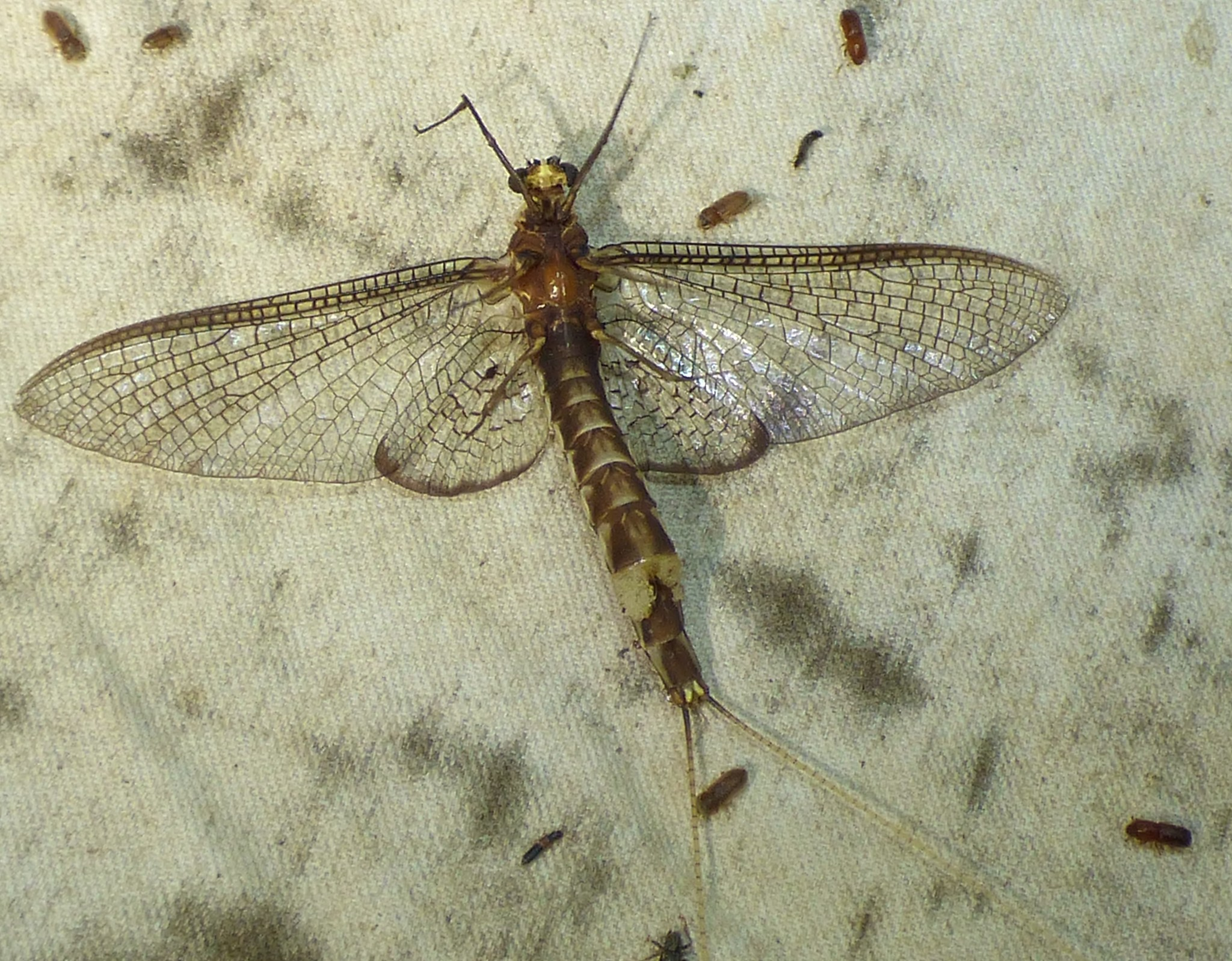
- Hexagenia atrocaudata from South Carolina

Scientific classification
- Domain: Eukaryota
- Kingdom: Animalia
- Phylum: Arthropoda
- Class: Insecta
- Order: Ephemeroptera
- Family: Ephemeridae
- Genus: Hexagenia
- Species: H. atrocaudata

Binomial name
- Hexagenia atrocaudata McDunnough, 1924

= Hexagenia atrocaudata =

Species of mayfly

Hexagenia atrocaudata is a species of common burrower mayfly in the family Ephemeridae. It is found in North America.
