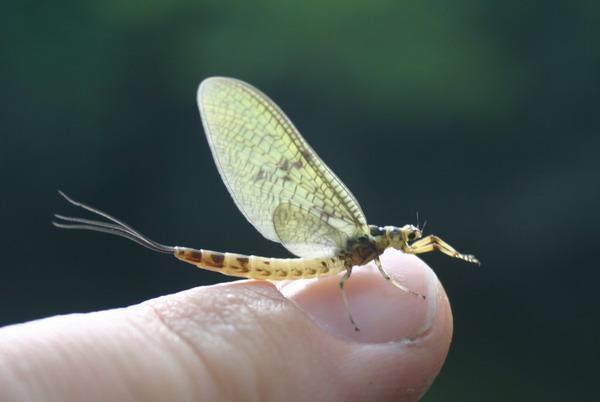
- Ephemera danica

Scientific classification
- Domain: Eukaryota
- Kingdom: Animalia
- Phylum: Arthropoda
- Class: Insecta
- Order: Ephemeroptera
- Suborder: Schistonota

Superfamilies
- Baetoidea; Ephemeroidea; Heptagenioidea; Leptophlebioidea

= Schistonota =

Suborder of mayflies

Schistonota is a suborder of mayflies. One of the differences between this suborder and its sister group, Pannota, concerns the degree of fusion of the wing pads in the final-stage nymph; in Schistonota, the degree of fusion along the mesothorax is more than half the fore-wing length while in Pannota the degree of fusion is less than half that length. Other differences between the two groups include the morphology of the gills and also behavioural differences. Schistonota nymphs are mostly active swimmers, burrowers or sprawlers, while Pannota nymphs are more passive, slow-moving crawlers.

The following superfamilies are recognised:

- Baetoidea
- Ephemeroidea
- Heptagenioidea
- Leptophlebioidea

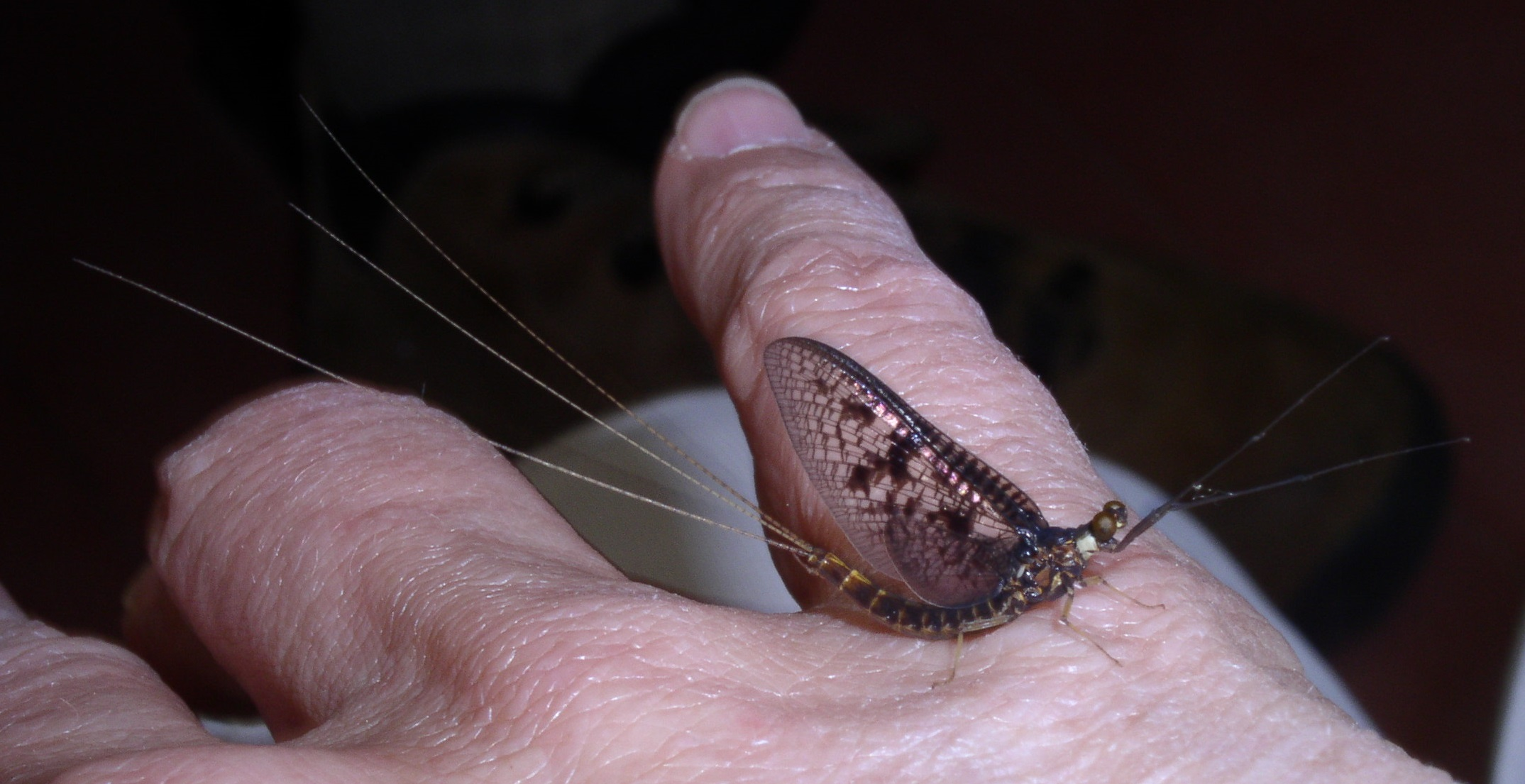
Ephemera simulans male
