= Litobrancha =

Scientific classification
- Domain: Eukaryota
- Kingdom: Animalia
- Phylum: Arthropoda
- Class: Insecta
- Order: Ephemeroptera
- Family: Ephemeridae
- Genus: Litobrancha; McCafferty, 1971

Genus of insects

Litobrancha is a genus of common burrower mayflies in the family Ephemeridae. There is at least one described species in Litobrancha, L. recurvata.
