= Protobehningia =

Scientific classification
- Domain: Eukaryota
- Kingdom: Animalia
- Phylum: Arthropoda
- Class: Insecta
- Order: Ephemeroptera
- Family: Behningiidae
- Genus: Protobehningia; Chernova, 1960

Genus of mayflies

Protobehningia is a genus of sand-burrowing mayfly in the family Behningiidae. There are at least two described species in Protobehningia.

== Species ==
These two species belong to the genus Protobehningia:

- Protobehningia asiatica Tshernova & Bajkova, 1960
- Protobehningia merga Peters & Gillies, 1991
