= Palingeniidae =

Scientific classification
- Kingdom: Animalia
- Phylum: Arthropoda
- Clade: Pancrustacea
- Class: Insecta
- Order: Ephemeroptera
- Suborder: Schistonota
- Superfamily: Ephemeroidea
- Family: Palingeniidae; Albarda in Selys-Lonchamps, 1888

Genera
- Chankagenesia; Mesopalingea; Mortogenesia; Palingenia

Family of mayflies

Palingeniidae is a family of mayflies, members of which are known as spiny-headed burrowing mayflies. These are generally quite large mayflies with more than four longitudinal cross-veins on their wings. Males have short, wide pronotums and the legs are well-developed in both sexes. The cerci (tails) on females are shorter than the body. The nymphs live burrowed in the mud at the bottom of large streams and rivers.

One of the best known members of the family is Palingenia longicauda, the Tisza mayfly after the European Tisza river, also known as the long-tailed mayfly and giant mayfly. It is the largest mayfly species in Europe, measuring 12 cm (4.7 in) from head to tail.
