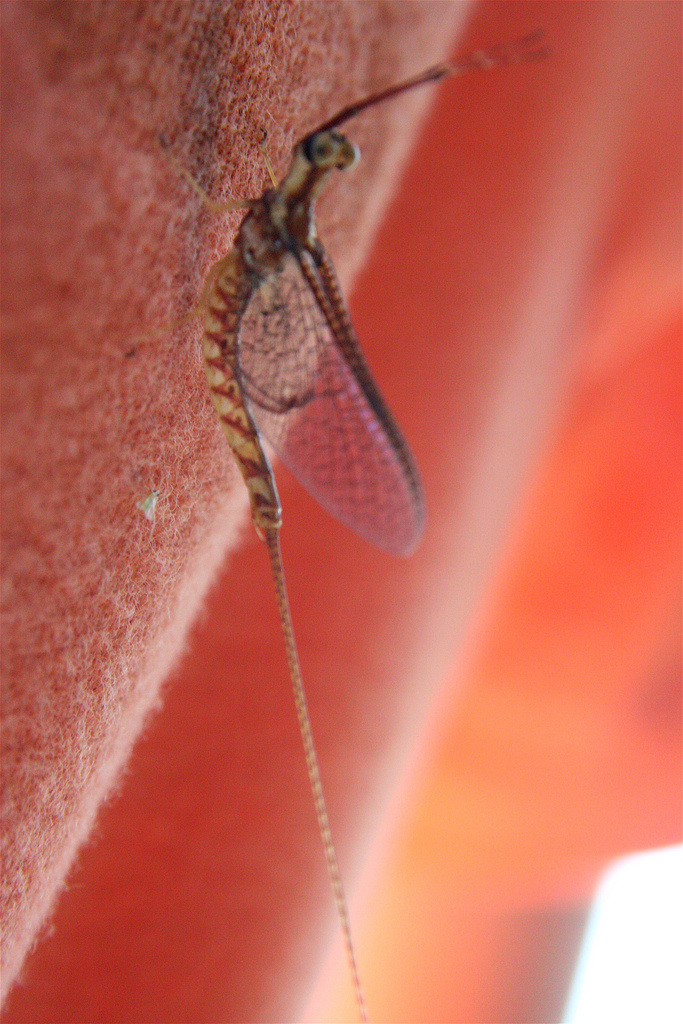
- Hexagenia limbata

Scientific classification
- Kingdom: Animalia
- Phylum: Arthropoda
- Clade: Pancrustacea
- Class: Insecta
- Order: Ephemeroptera
- Family: Ephemeridae
- Genus: Hexagenia; Walsh, 1863

= Hexagenia =

Genus of mayflies

Hexagenia is a genus of mayflies in the family Ephemeridae, the common burrower mayflies. These are large insects, widely distributed across North America. They are common near bodies of water, and are important food sources for fish and other organisms, as well as being notable insects to the fly fishing community.

== General information ==
Hexagenia is a genus of large mayflies, primarily native to the northern United States and Canada. Some species have ranges that extend as far south as Mexico and Central America. They are commonly referred to as "giant mayflies", or "burrowing mayflies" as their nymphal stages construct U-shaped, ventilated burrows in the aquatic substrate at the bottom of lakes, streams, and ponds. These mayflies can construct burrows in a variety of materials, with different species preferring different substrates, such as clay, silt, and sand.

== Description / Morphology ==
Hexagenia mayflies share similar morphology with the rest of Ephemeroptera, with some notable differences. Hexagenia, as in all Ephemeroptera, have an aquatic larval stage, known as naiads. Hexagenia naiads are wingless, dorso-ventrally compressed, with three "tails",(two cerci and a median caudal filament) and large, laterally projecting fringed gills on abdominal segments 2-7, which allow them to absorb dissolved oxygen from the water in which they live. Hexagenia species most notably have two large tusk-like projections on the head to aid in the process of constructing burrows. The forelegs of this mayfly are fossorial, and have broad, modified tibia for moving substrate.

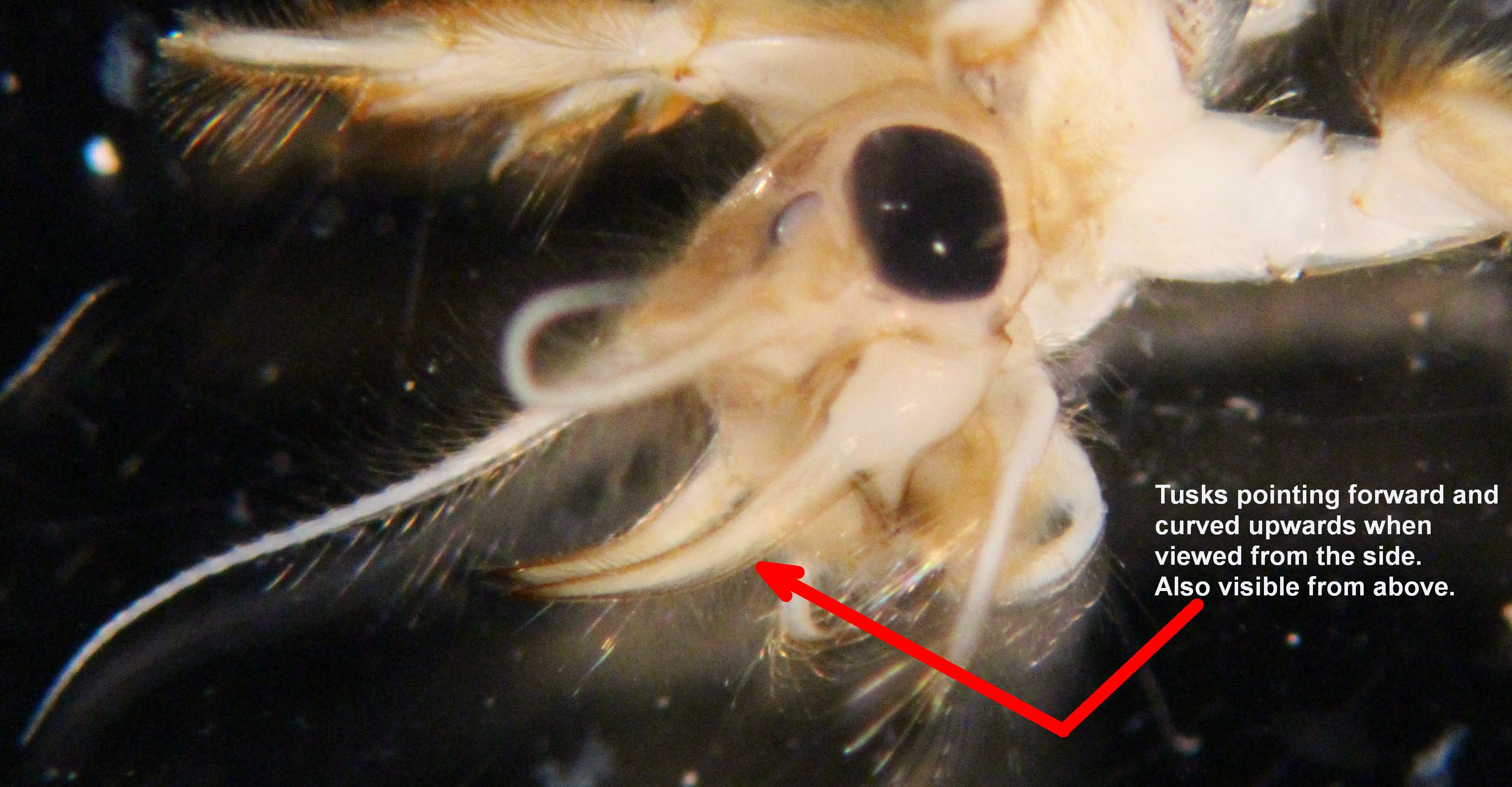
Tusklike projections on naiad mandibles, which aid in digging

Adult Hexagenia have large, membranous wings, and only two "tails" at the end of their abdomen. The adult stages are nonfeeding, and short-lived. Adult mayflies have two stages. The first stage, the subimago stage, comes directly after emergence. This wings of this stage have a cloudy, opaque appearance. The subimago stage cannot reproduce and does not have functional genitalia. The subimago stage often lasts for less than 24 hours, at which point the insect molts. It emerges in the imago stage, which is similarly short-lived, but has clear wings, and is capable of mating and laying eggs. Both the subimago and imago stages do not have functional mouthparts, and cannot eat. After mating, Hexagenia females can be seen laying eggs on the surface of the water, usually in the evenings. They accomplish this by repeatedly rebounding off the surface of calm, still water. These gravid females are known as "spinners".

== Distribution and habitat ==
Hexagenia are common across the northern United States and Southern Canada. Their range extends south, into Florida and northern Mexico. The Global Biodiversity Information Facility contains reports of Hexagenia found as far south as Argentina, and as far east as India and Mongolia. These reports are few and scattered, and may represent misidentifications, or mislabeling of geographic location.

Hexagenia are usually found in still or slow-moving water, due in part to the need for silt, clay, or fine sand to construct their burrows. They are found in the lotic-depositional areas of rivers, which are slow enough to allow for the settling of sediment for burrowing. They can also be found in the shallow waters of lakes, ponds, and streams with soft substrate bottoms. Hexagenia mayflies are intolerant to pollution, and low oxygen levels.

== Life history / Ecology / Behavior ==
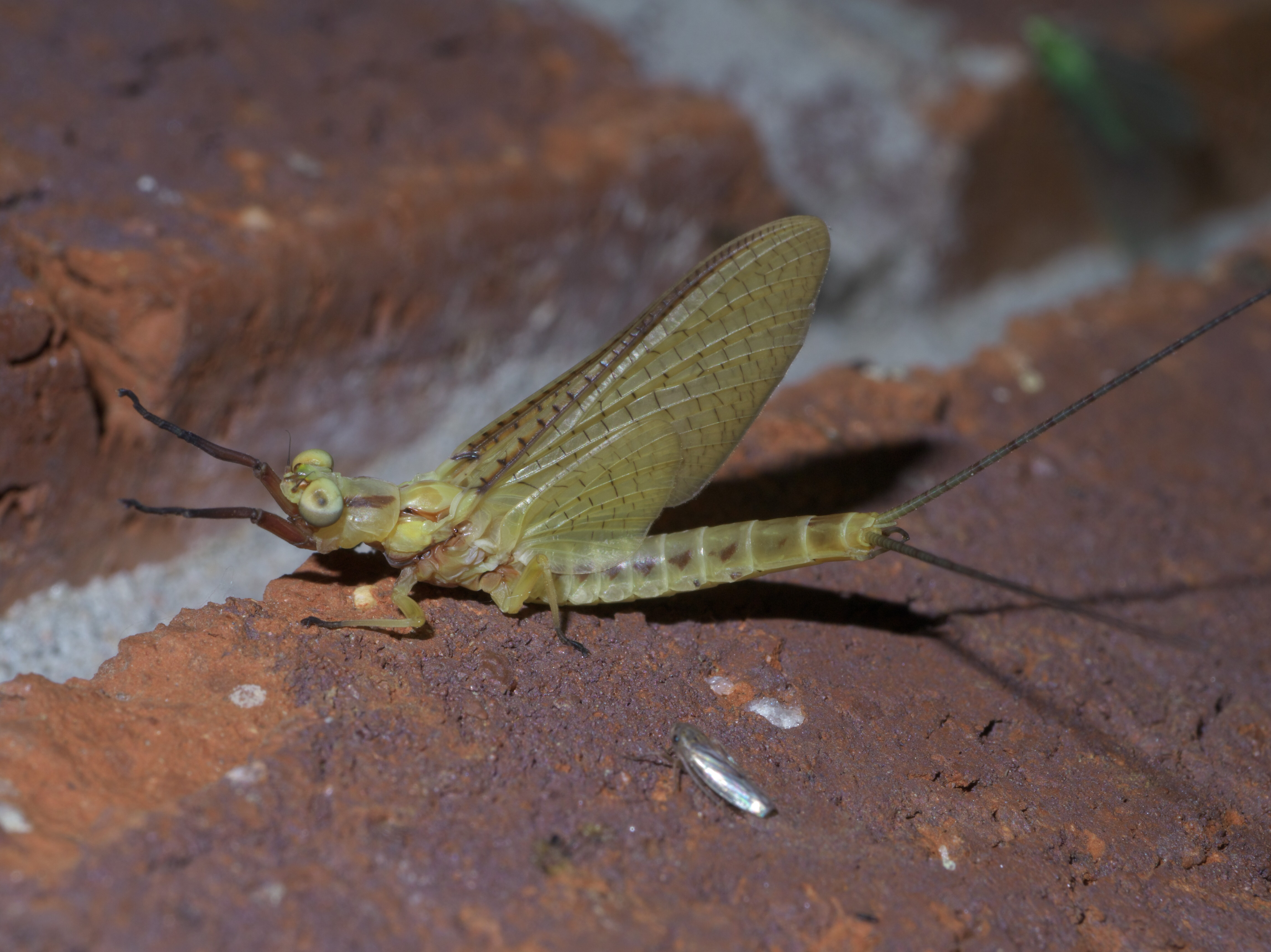
Adult Hexagenia bilineata subimago

Juveniles are detritivores, and feed by undulating their bodies inside their burrows. This pulls water containing food particulates into their burrows, where they can gather it from the walls of their burrow, or filter out the particles of food. This method of feeding also keeps oxygenated water moving over the insects gills.

Hexagenia mayflies are hemimetabolous insects, undergoing incomplete metamorphosis. They have immature aquatic stages, and short-lived, winged, adult stages. The juveniles resemble the adults, but lack wings, functional genitalia, and have well-developed mouthparts for grazing, gills for respiration, and three caudal filaments (two cerci and a median filament), compared to the two cerci present in adult stages.

The nymphal stage usually lasts between one and two years, influenced by temperature, availability of food, and habitat. In colder regions, the juvenile stage may last as long as four years. When the juveniles are ready to emerge, they swim to the surface where they molt and become subimagoes. The subimagoes molt one more time, becoming imagoes, which are sexually mature. Mating swarms form above the water, and female spinners lay eggs on the surface of the water.

== Taxonomy / Phylogeny ==
Hexagenia is a genus within the order Ephemeroptera, one of the most basal orders of winged insects (subclass Pterygota), originating in the Carboniferous. This makes them one of the most ancient insect orders. Members of this genus are placed within the proposed group "Fossoriae", the burrowing mayflies. Mayflies in Fossoriae construct larval burrows. The group falls within the mayfly family Ephemeridae. There are eight recognized species in the genus Hexagenia.

== Significance to humans ==
Hexagenia mayflies are of particular importance to the fishing community. These insects are prey for many species of trout and are fed upon heavily during their synchronous mass emergences in the late spring and early summer.

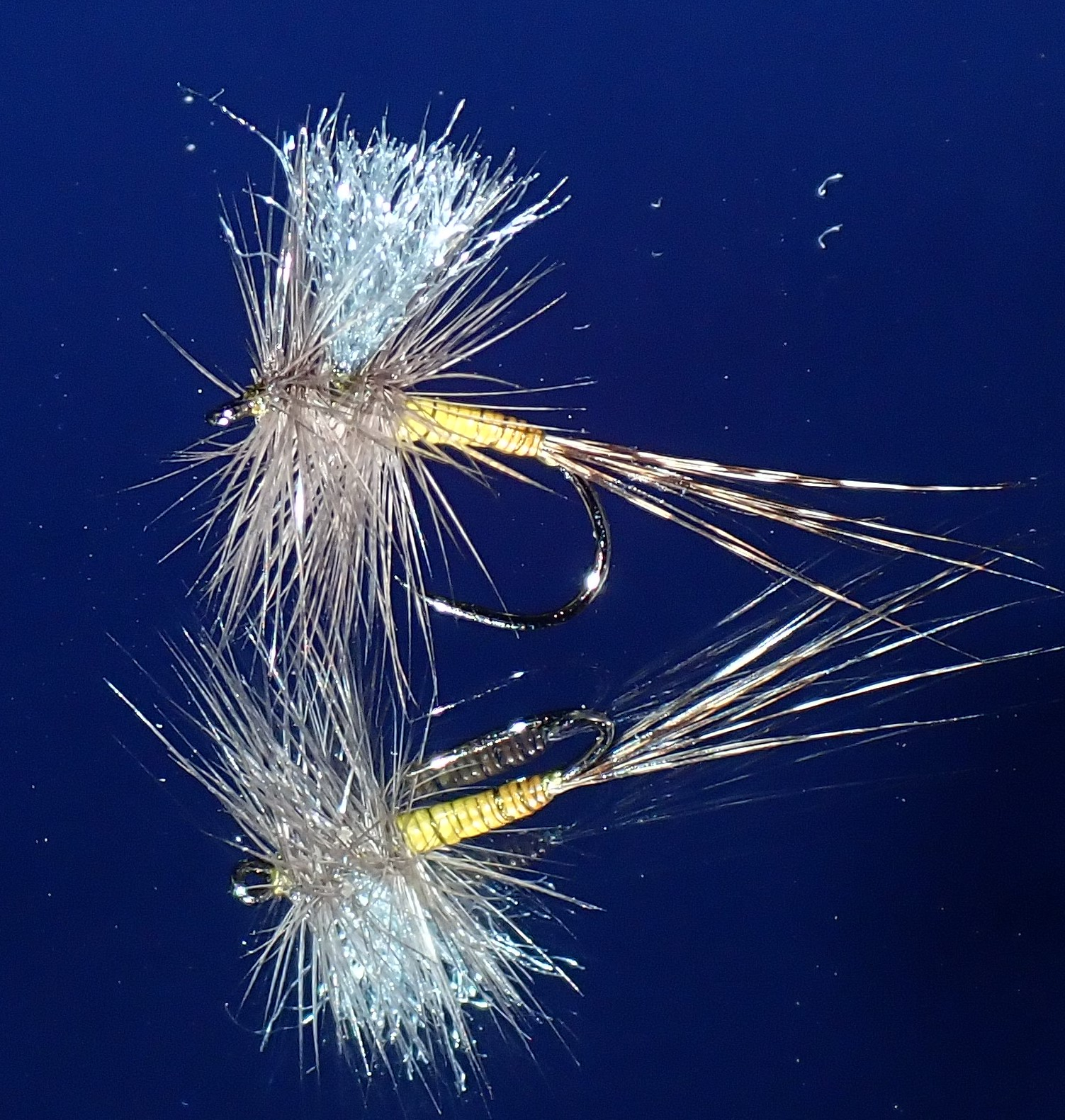
Example of mayfly imitations used by fly fisherman

To catch trout that feed on Hexagenia, fly fishermen utilize dozens of different flies which mimic the appearance of these insects. Referred to as "hex patterns", these flies often imitate Hexagenia limbata, the giant burrowing mayfly.

Hexagenia mayflies can emerge in such great numbers that they decrease visibility on the roads, creating potentially hazardous conditions for drivers. Attracted by light sources created by humans, these insects can swarm towns and roads near bodies of water. Clouds of emerging adults can even grow large enough to be picked up by weather radar.

Their intolerance to pollution and anoxic conditions makes Hexagenia mayflies important bioindicators of human impact on the health of bodies of water. Agricultural runoff, industrial waste, sewage and wastewater greatly reduce Hexagenia populations in the affected body of water. Ecologists survey the change in species diversity in a given body of water to understand the impact of human activities on that water system. Mayflies, especially Hexagenias can be used as indicators of heavy metal pollution, microplastic contamination, and eutrophication caused by agricultural runoff. The presence, absence, and density of Hexagenia naiads in a body of water can indicate the health of that body of water, or the impact that pollutants are having on that body of water.

== Threats/Conservation Status ==
Recent, large-scale studies of North American Waterways show decline in the population of Hexgenia mayflies. Population decline of 50-80% was observed in the western basin of Lake Erie, and the Upper Mississippi River since the year 2010. Despite this, Hexagenia limbata and Hexagenia bilineata are awarded no special conservation status, though they are widespread species of ecological importance. This is likely true the other lesser-known species in the family Hexagenia as well. If these insects continue to be exposed to ecological stressors—such as habitat loss, agricultural runoff, microplastic contamination, and heavy metal pollution, —some populations may face extirpation in areas of their historical range.

== Species ==
These eight species belong to the genus Hexagenia:

- Hexagenia albivitta (Walker, 1853)^{i c g}
- Hexagenia atrocaudata McDunnough, 1924^{i c g b}
- Hexagenia bilineata (Say, 1824)^{i c g b}
- Hexagenia callineura Banks, 1914^{c g}
- Hexagenia limbata (Serville, 1829)^{i c g b}
- Hexagenia mexicana Eaton, 1885^{i c g}
- Hexagenia orlando Traver, 1931^{i c g b}
- Hexagenia rigida McDunnough, 1924^{i c g b}

Data sources: i = ITIS, c = Catalogue of Life, g = GBIF, b = Bugguide.net

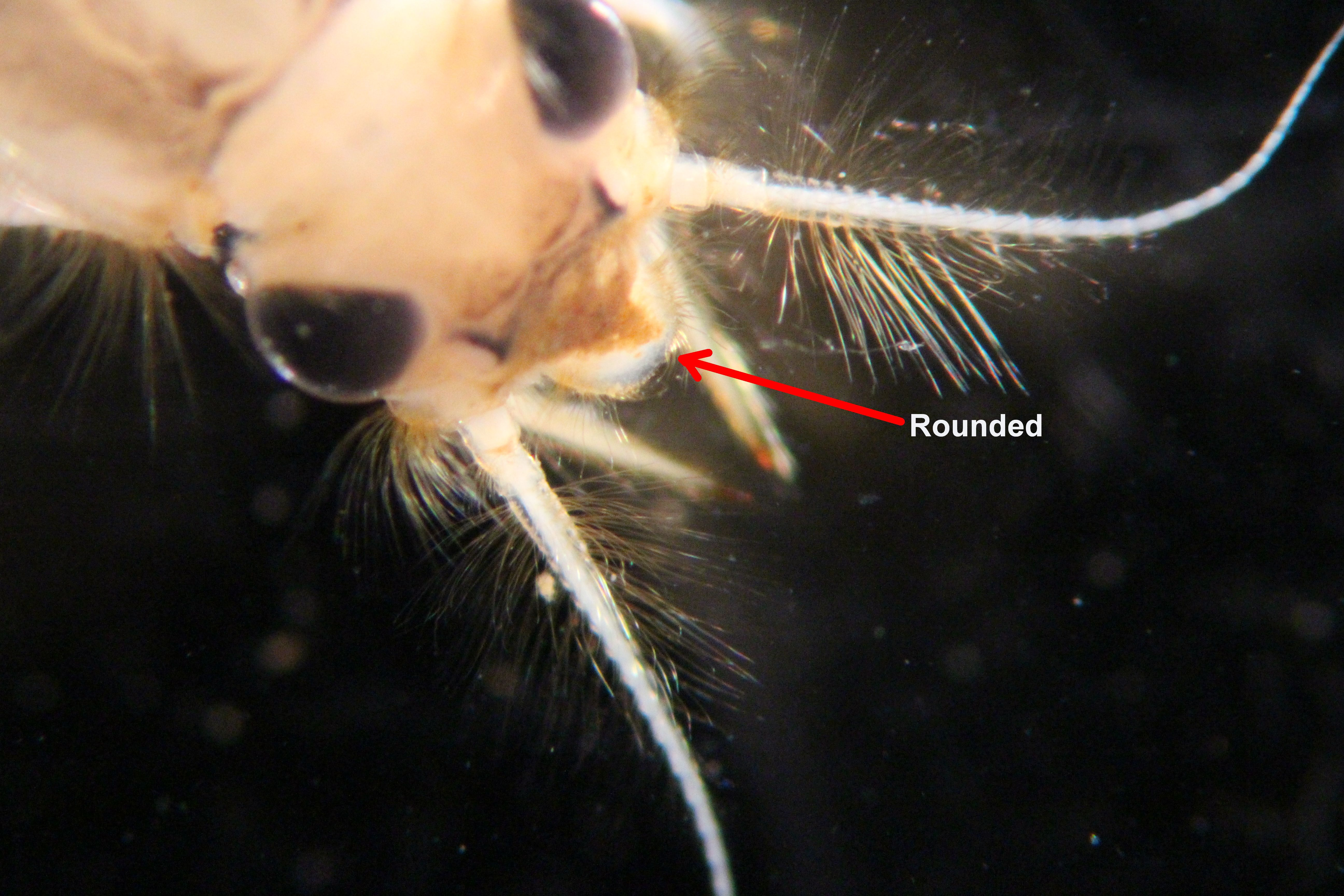
Hexagenia frontal process

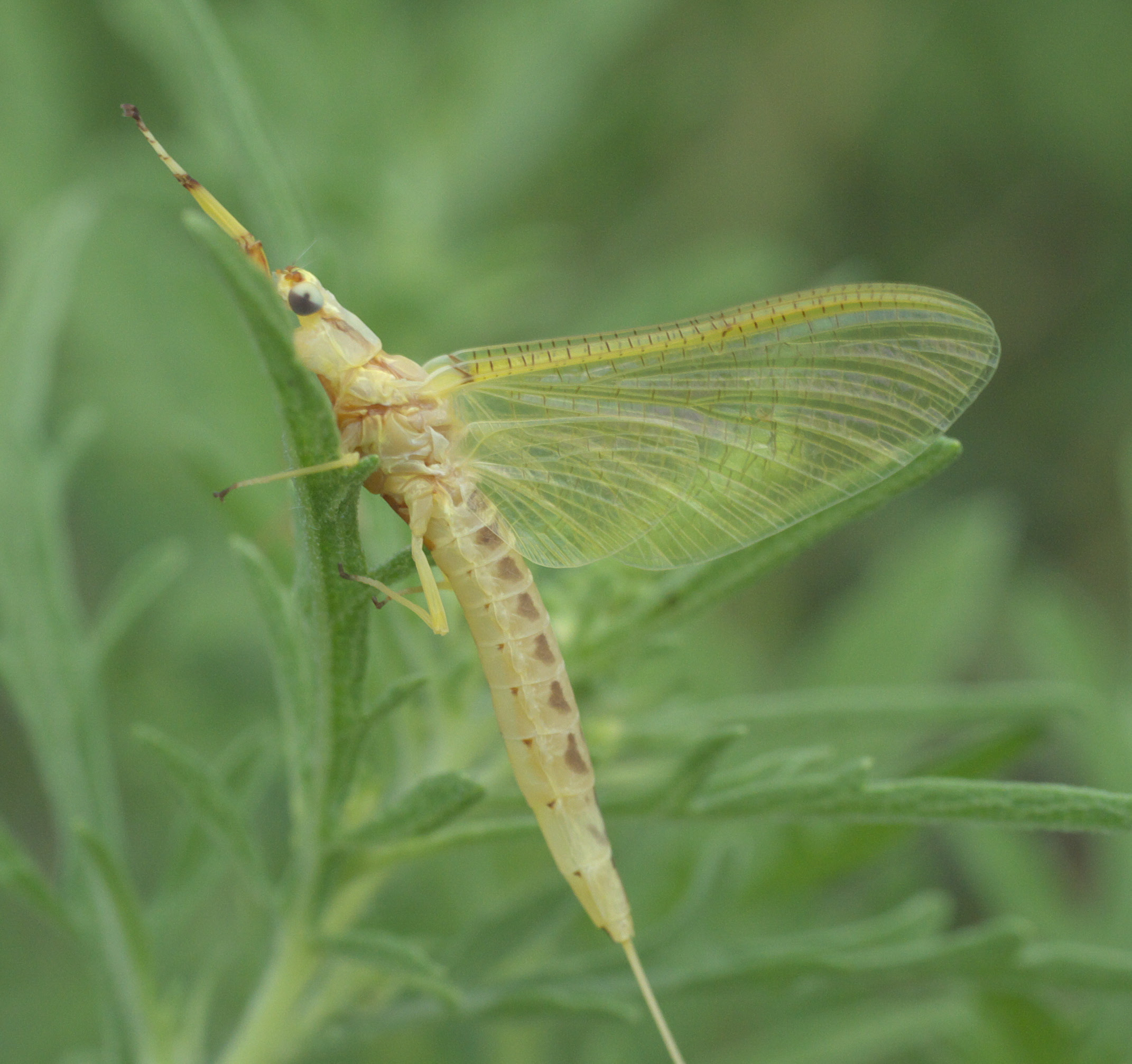
