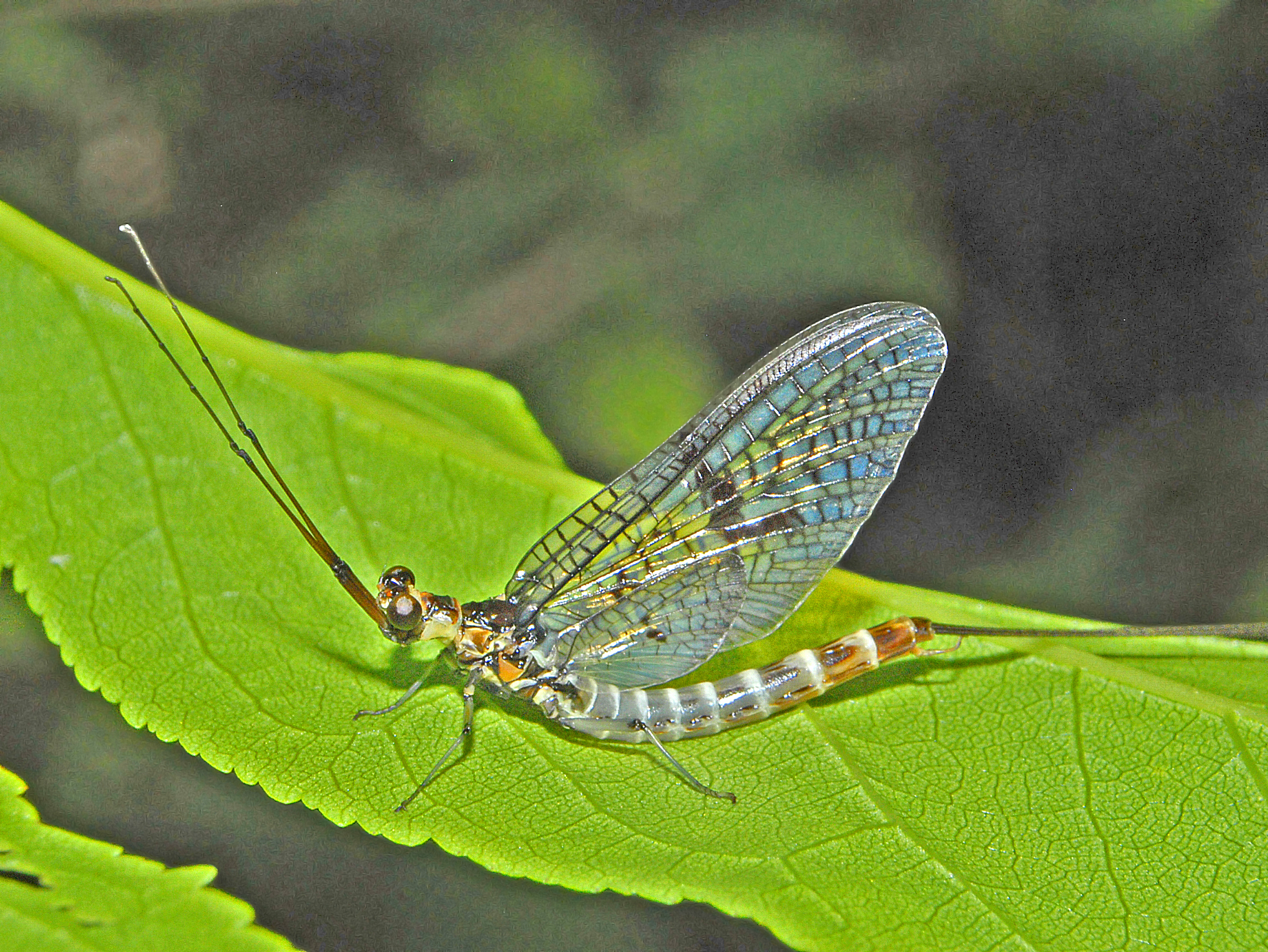
- Imago of a male of Ephemera danica

Scientific classification
- Kingdom: Animalia
- Phylum: Arthropoda
- Clade: Pancrustacea
- Class: Insecta
- Order: Ephemeroptera
- Family: Ephemeridae
- Genus: Ephemera
- Species: E. danica

Binomial name
- Ephemera danica Müller, 1764

= Ephemera danica =

Species of mayfly

Ephemera danica, the green drake or green drake mayfly, is a species of mayfly in the genus Ephemera.

== Description ==
Ephemera danica can reach an imago size of 15–20 mm (0.6–0.8 in) in males, while females are larger, reaching 16–25 mm (0.6–1.0 in). This mayfly, with its characteristic markings and three tails (cerci), is the most commonly seen of British Ephemeridae. Imago wings are translucent with dark veining, while in subimago they are dull and yellowish with brown veins. Moreover, forelegs and the tails of the spinners are much longer than in duns. Mouthparts are non-functional, as adults do not feed.

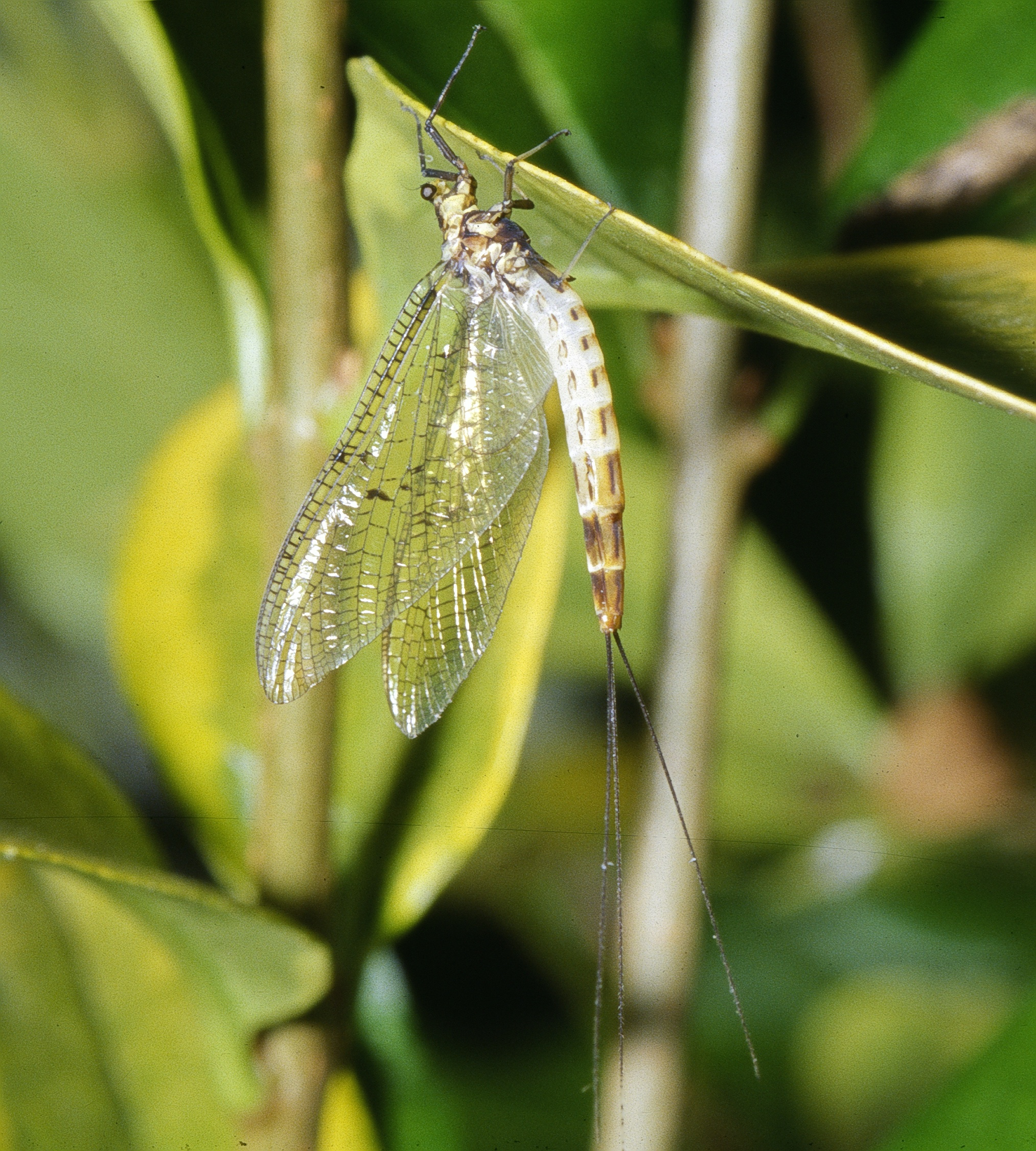
Typical curved body posture of E. danica, in the rest position

These insects are aeroplankton and usually are food for swallows, trout and various species of amphibians and spiders.

== Life cycle ==
The life cycle usually lasts one or two years, but sometimes the developing nymphal forms may last for up to three years. Nymphs can reach a length of about 30 millimetres (1.2 in). They dig tunnels into the gravel in the beds of rivers and feed by filtering organic detritus, before emerging in spring and moving towards shallow waters.

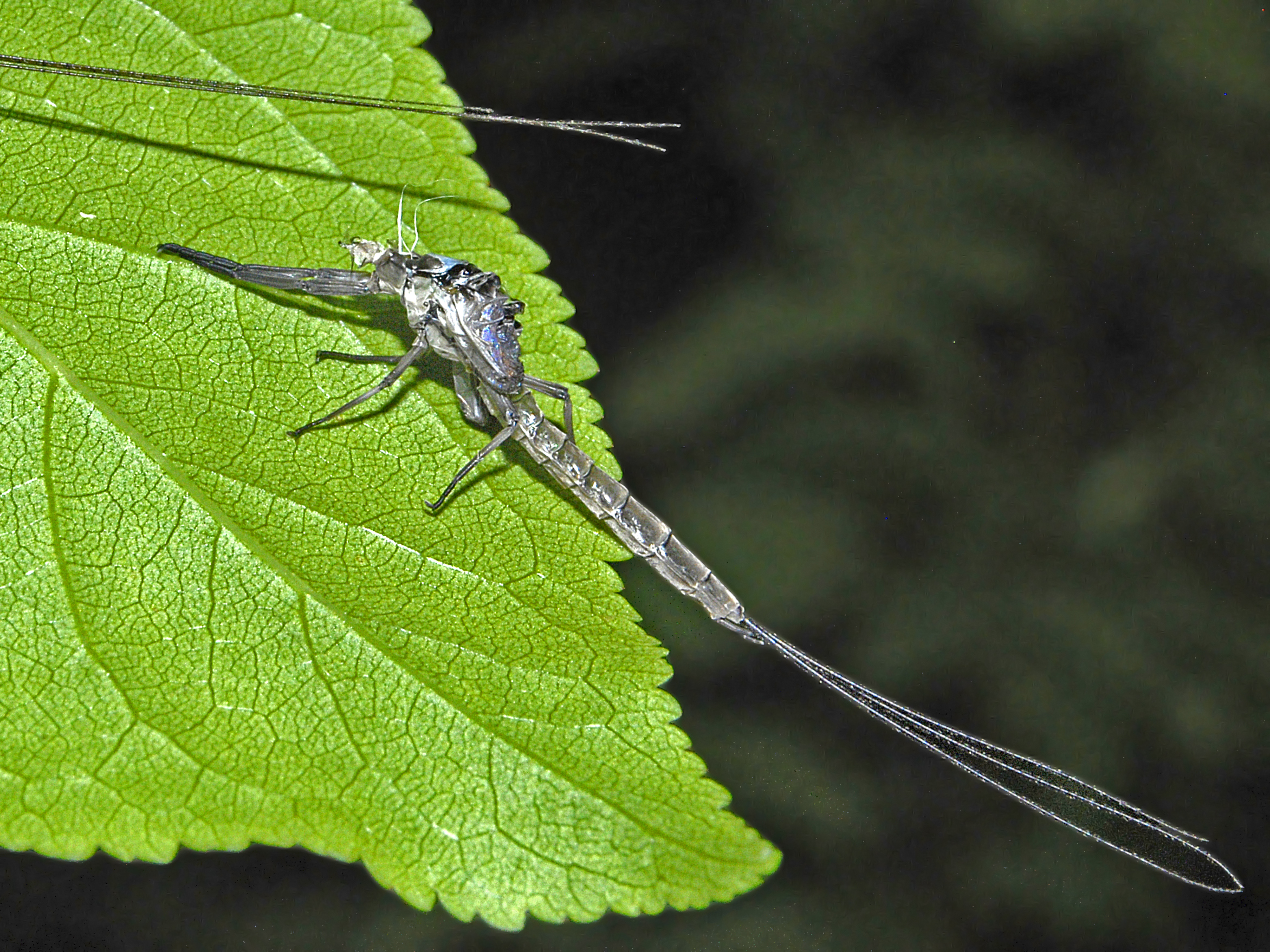
Exuvia of Ephemera danica

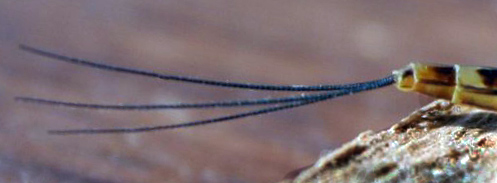
The three cerci at the end of the abdomen

The adults mainly can be found in May–June (hence the common name of mayfly), at the end of many larval stages. Adults may be often present between April and November. The lifetime of adults is very short (around four days at the most), hence its genus name (Ephemera).

Females fly on the surface of the water and dip their abdomen onto the surface to lay eggs. At the end of this process, females fall onto the surface of the water and die.

== Distribution and habitat ==
This species is commonly found in clear water rivers and lakes with sandy or gravel bottoms throughout Europe, including the British Isles.

== See also ==
- List of mayflies of the British Isles
