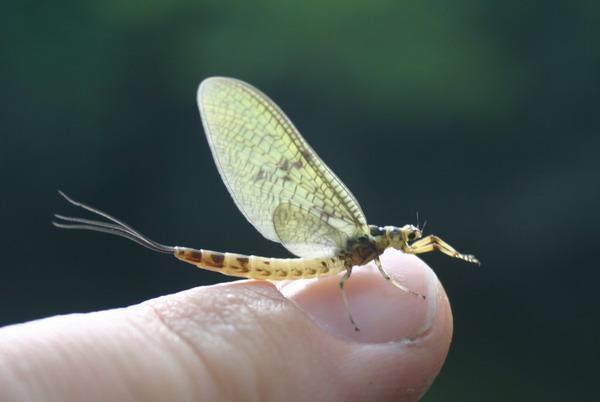
- Ephemera danica

Scientific classification
- Kingdom: Animalia
- Phylum: Arthropoda
- Class: Insecta
- Order: Ephemeroptera
- Suborder: Schistonota
- Superfamily: Ephemeroidea
- Family: Ephemeridae; Latreille, 1810

= Ephemeridae =

Family of mayflies

Ephemeridae is a family of mayflies with about 150 described species found throughout the world except Australia and Oceania.

== Description ==
Ephemerids are generally quite large mayflies (up to 35 mm) with either two or three very long tails. Many species have distinctively patterned wings. They breed in a wide range of waters, usually requiring a layer of silt as the nymphs have strong legs which are adapted for burrowing (the group is sometimes known as burrowing mayflies).

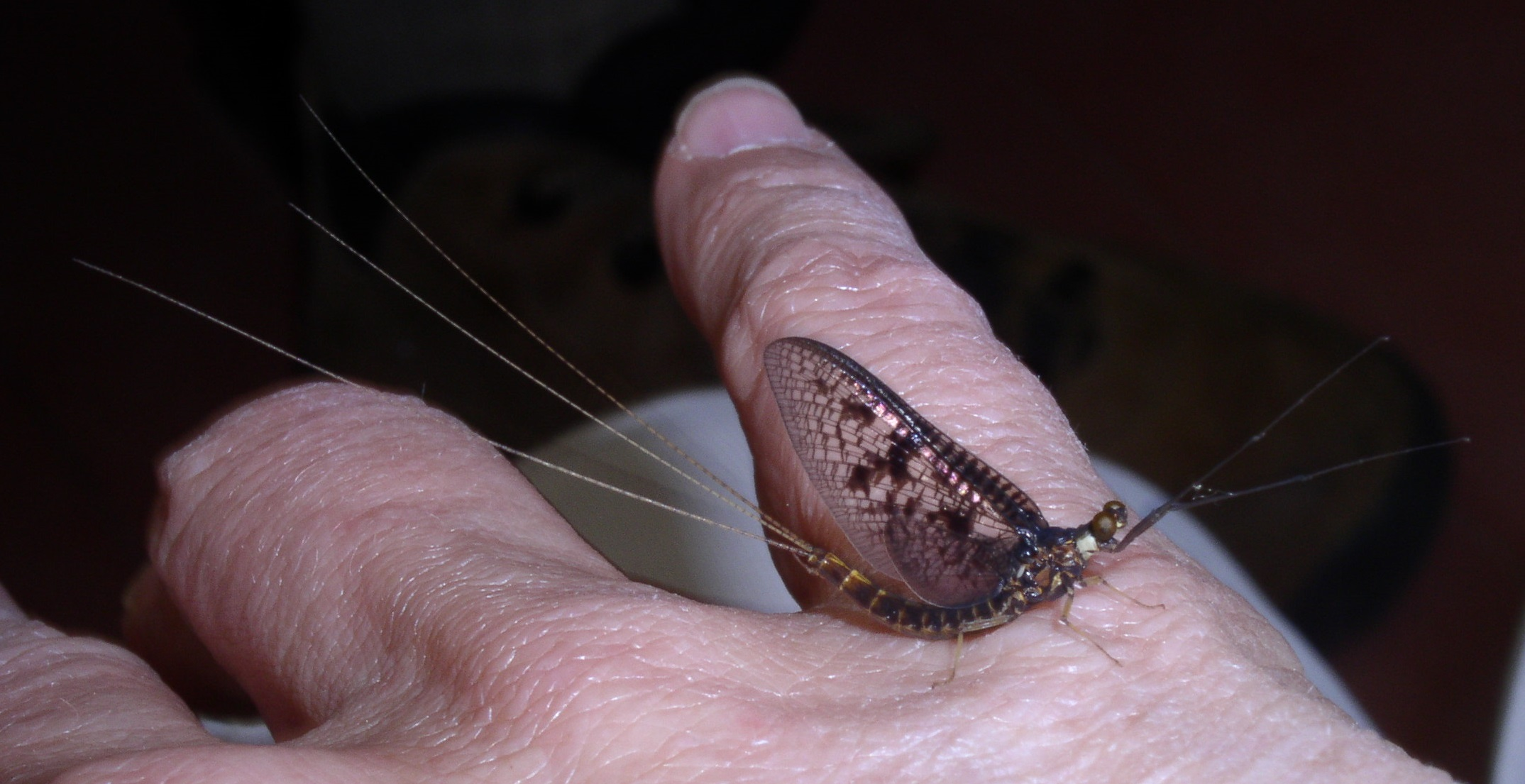
Ephemera simulans male

== Nymphal Ecology ==
Ephemerid nymphs are known to possess special adaptations to aid in their burrowing lifestyles. “Fossorial Foretibia” or spur-like projections on their wide legs enhance their burrowing ability. While digging and living in substrate, water can be muddied and oxygen can be difficult to absorb. Ephemerids possess plumose and lanceolate shaped abdominal gills to combat this obstacle. Unlike other Ephemeropteran families, Ephemeridae gills are slightly more dorsal in position, this prevents loose substrate from getting caught while burrowing. The greater surface area of the gill amplifies the insect’s ability to take in oxygen in dirtied water, or while submerged in substrate. These gills can also be moved like fins to create currents to move oxygenated water. Another characteristic ephemerids display are mandibular “tusk” like projections on their head, these tusks help move substrate out of the way while burrowing, with the foretibia acting like shovels and move substrate back.

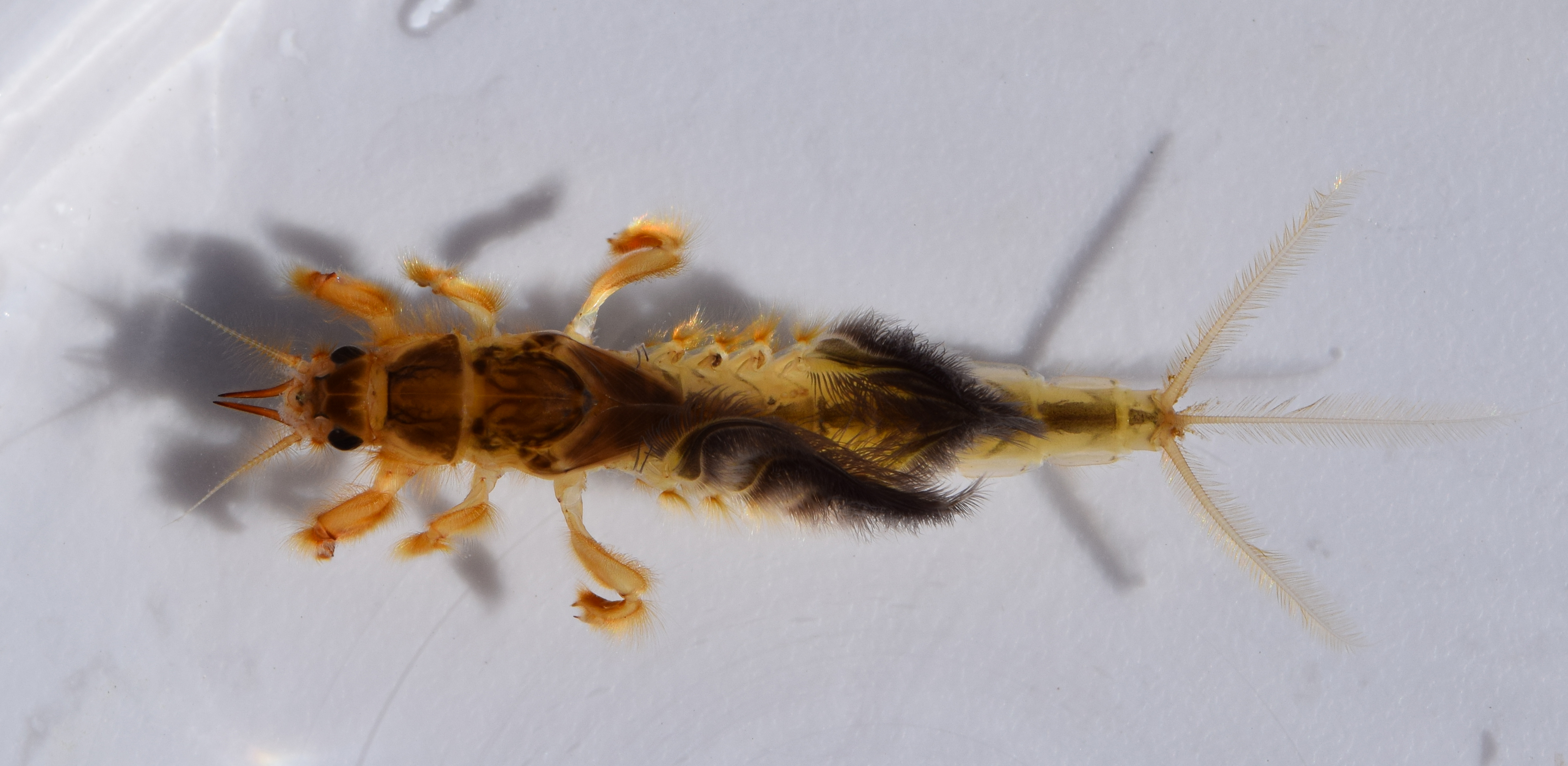
Hexagenia limbata nymph, note the large tusks, and feather like gills

Emphemeridae can be found in lotic and lentic freshwater systems and are generally widespread in the Nearctic. They can be found burrowing in several types of substrate including sand, gravel and silt. Similar to the rest of the order of Ephemeroptera, Empheridae does require higher levels of oxygen and has a low tolerance for pollution.

The family is generally regarded as collectors and gatherers. Considering this family occupies “benthic” freshwater zones, the primary food source is decomposing organic matter, and are designated as detritivores.

== Genera ==
The Global Biodiversity Information Facility includes:

1. Afromera Demoulin, 1955
2. Denina McCafferty, 1987
3. Eatonica Navás, 1913
4. Eatonigenia Ulmer, 1939
5. Ephemera Linnaeus, 1758
6. Hexagenia Walsh, 1863
7. Litobrancha McCafferty, 1971
8. Parabaetis Haupt, 1956
9. Pentagenia Walsh, 1863
10. Phthartus Handlirsch, 1904

== See also ==
- List of mayflies of the British Isles
