= Edge of Allegiance =

Studio album by Timbuk 3
- Released: 1989
- Length: 40:05
- Label: I.R.S.
- Producer: Timbuk 3, Denardo Coleman

Timbuk 3 chronology
Eden Alley (1988)	Edge of Allegiance (1989)	Big Shot in the Dark (1991)

Edge of Allegiance is the third album by the American band Timbuk 3, released in 1989.

The album's first single was "National Holiday".

== Production ==
The album was produced by Timbuk 3 and Denardo Coleman. It was recorded in Austin and mixed in Houston. The band employed less overdubbing than on past albums, while also singing the harmonies in the moment. The lyrics were in part influenced by Leonard Cohen; the band started listening to him after Cohen mentioned in interviews his admiration for "The Future's So Bright, I Gotta Wear Shades". Timbuk 3 considered the album to be evenly divided between political songs and relationship songs.

== Critical reception ==
Professional ratings
Review scores
Source	Rating
AllMusic	4/5 stars
Robert Christgau	B+
The Encyclopedia of Popular Music	3/5 stars
MusicHound Rock: The Essential Album Guide	3.5/5 stars
Ottawa Citizen	3/5 stars
Windsor Star	A−

Trouser Press wrote: "Oozing sardonic desperation, Edge of Allegiance ... is yet another small triumph of sane, thoughtful songcraft—occasionally labored ('Standard White Jesus') but more often right on the money." Robert Christgau posited that "their songs will remain winsome and wise for as long as the record company puts them out." The Los Angeles Daily News considered the album to be one of 1989's best, calling Timbuk 3 "one of the decade's most underrated acts."

The Windsor Star opined that the band "have a sardonic sense of the absurd but enough compassion so that their music never sinks to mere parody and loses its punch." The Ottawa Citizen noted that "lustre and sophistication have turned the flat street-corner style into something with more depth and nuance." The St. Petersburg Times deemed the album "another cunning collection of sharp-tongued diatribes against political betrayal and social apathy."

== Track listing ==
All songs written by Pat MacDonald, except where noted.

1. "National Holiday" – 4:02
2. "Waves of Grain" – 3:45
3. "Dirty Dirty Rice" – 2:53
4. "Pass It On" – 2:51
5. "Standard White Jesus" – 4:47
6. "Grand Old Party" – 3:16 (Pat and Barbara K. MacDonald)
7. "Count to Ten" – 3:54
8. "B-Side of Life" – 3:15
9. "Acid Rain" – 3:44
10. "Daddy's Down in the Mine" – 3:10
11. “Don't Give Up on Me” – 2:46
12. “Wheel of Fortune” – 2:30

== Personnel ==
- Barbara K. MacDonald – Vocals, electric guitar, violin, drum programming
- Pat MacDonald – Vocals, acoustic and electric guitars, bass, harmonica, guitar synth, sampler
- Denardo Coleman – Drums, percussion
