= Timbuk =

Timbuk may refer to:

- Timbuk Tu; see Timbuktu, a town in Mali in West Africa
- Timbuk 3; see Timbuk3, American post-punk band
  - Greetings from Timbuk 3, a 1986 Timbuk3 album
- Timbuk: The Last Runaway Slave; see List of In Living Color sketches
