= Steel Bridge Songfest =

Annual music festival held in Wisconsin

Coordinates: 44°50′10.2″N 87°22′42.3″W

Steel Bridge Songfest ("Steel Bridge" for short) is an annual, four-day music festival held in Sturgeon Bay, Wisconsin. Founded in 2005 by musician Pat MacDonald the event began as part of a grass-roots campaign to restore a historic bridge. The festival features a week-long collaborative songwriting workshop (called the Construction Zone) where participants write songs inspired by the bridge. The songs are recorded on-site at the Holiday Music Motel and released as compilation albums. Steel Bridge Songs Vol.10 was released during Steel Bridge Songfest 10th Anniversary (2016)

== History ==
The Michigan Street Bridge a.k.a. Sturgeon Bay Bridge (originally called "Memorial Bridge") is a multi-span Warren/Parker truss bridge built in 1929 and dedicated the following year. It connects Wisconsin State Highway 57 to the Third Avenue business district, carrying motor and foot traffic over the Sturgeon Bay Shipping Canal. The structure is a Door County landmark, and appears in the official logo of the city of Sturgeon Bay. Its rolling bascule lift spans are unique in the country, and in 2008 it was placed on the National Register of Historic Places.

In 1995, continuous remote monitoring by Northwestern University's Infrastructure Technology Institute detected new cracks in the track casting, later confirmed by the Wisconsin Department of Transportation (WisDOT). Though the cracks were repaired, a 1997 Programmatic Agreement amongst the Federal Highway Administration (FHWA), Advisory Council on Historic Preservation (ACHP), and Wisconsin State Historic Preservation Officer (SHPO) determined that the bridge did not warrant preservation. In 1999, the FHWA began considering plans to demolish and replace the bridge.

It is during this time that Citizens For Our Bridge, a non-profit 501(c)(3), was founded as "S.O.B."s ("Save Our Bridge"). The group was formed by citizens opposed to the suggested destruction. Working together with ACHP and the National Trust for Historic Preservation, CFOB proposed a plan to rehabilitate the structure. To raise funds to carry out the plan, CFOB founder Christie Weber and her brother, musician Pat MacDonald, organized a small music festival. MacDonald enlisted the help of his longtime friend, singer/songwriter Jackson Browne, and Steel Bridge Songfest was born.

== Participating musicians ==
A sampling of musicians who have lent their talents to Steel Bridge:

- Chris Aaron Band (Madison, WI)
- Jackson Browne (Santa Monica, CA)
- Charles Boheme (Madison, WI)
- Todd Carey (Chicago, IL)
- Charlie Cheney (Sturgeon Bay, WI)
- Kacy Crowley (Austin, TX)
- The Dark Horse Project (Milwaukee, WI)
- Victor DeLorenzo of the Violent Femmes (Milwaukee, WI)
- Louise Goffin (Los Angeles, CA)
- Dana Erlandson (Green Bay, WI)
- Craig Greenberg (New York, NY)
- Emiko (New York, NY)
- James Hall (Atlanta, GA)
- Freedy Johnston (Nashville, TN)
- Jon Kanis (San Diego, CA)
- Tarl Knight (Green Bay, WI)
- Johnny Lowebow (Memphis, TN)
- Pat MacDonald (Sturgeon Bay, WI)
- Kim Manning of P-Funk (Los Angeles, CA)
- Ellie Maybe (Madison, WI)
- Eric McFadden (San Francisco, CA)
- melaniejane (Milwaukee, WI)
- Alex Mitchard (Madison, WI)
- Liv Mueller (Austin, TX)
- Kory Murphy (Green Bay, WI)
- Bruce Reaves (South Bend, IN)
- Dorothy Scott (New York, NY)
- Brandon Seyferth (Chicago, IL)
- Sigmund Snopek III of the Violent Femmes (Milwaukee, WI)
- Jonathan Spottiswoode (New York, NY/London, UK)
- Clyde Stubblefield (Madison, WI)
- Victoria Vox (Baltimore, MD)
- Jane Wiedlin of The Go-Go's (Los Angeles, CA)
- Geri X (St. Petersburg, FL)
- James McMurtry (Austin, TX)
