= A Hundred Lovers =

Studio album by Timbuk 3
- Released: 1995
- Label: High Street
- Producer: Pat MacDonald, Barbara K

Timbuk 3 chronology
Espace Ornano (1993)	A Hundred Lovers (1995)

A Hundred Lovers is the final album by the American band Timbuk 3. It was released in 1995. The title track was a minor radio hit.

== Production ==
Recorded by Timbuk 3 as a quartet, the album was produced by Pat MacDonald and Barbara K. The band used their home studio, as well as, for parts of one track, Jackson Browne's. "Legalize Our Love" is a pro-gay marriage song.

== Critical reception ==
Professional ratings
Review scores
Source	Rating
AllMusic	4/5 stars
The Atlanta Journal-Constitution	2.5/4 stars
Calgary Herald	D
Robert Christgau	(neither)
Rolling Stone	3/5 stars
The Virgin Encyclopedia of Eighties Music	3/5 stars

Trouser Press wrote: "Irritation at the state of the world remains the order of the day, but messages come wrapped in vibrant, funky sounds." People determined that "the dance grooves get a little stale, but the MacDonalds still sound assured on acoustic gems like 'Prey'." The Calgary Herald deemed the album "proficient pop smothered in generic harmonies, guy-girl vocal trade-offs, smitten here and there by anemically funky riffs."

The Vancouver Sun called it "a collection of catchy, folk-tinted pop numbers with an upbeat feel." The Atlanta Journal-Constitution concluded that "those who have always loved their cynically mellow attitude, deadpan harmonies and unrelenting wordplay will be delighted."

== Track listing ==
1. "Sunshine Is Dangerous"
2. "A Hundred Lovers"
3. "Just Wanna Funk with Your Mind"
4. "Legalize Our Love"
5. "Cynical"
6. "Not Yet Gone"
7. "Prey"
8. "Shotgun Wedding"
9. "Kitchen Fire"
10. "Inside Out"
