= Sturgeon Bay Bridge =

Historic bridge in Sturgeon Bay, Wisconsin

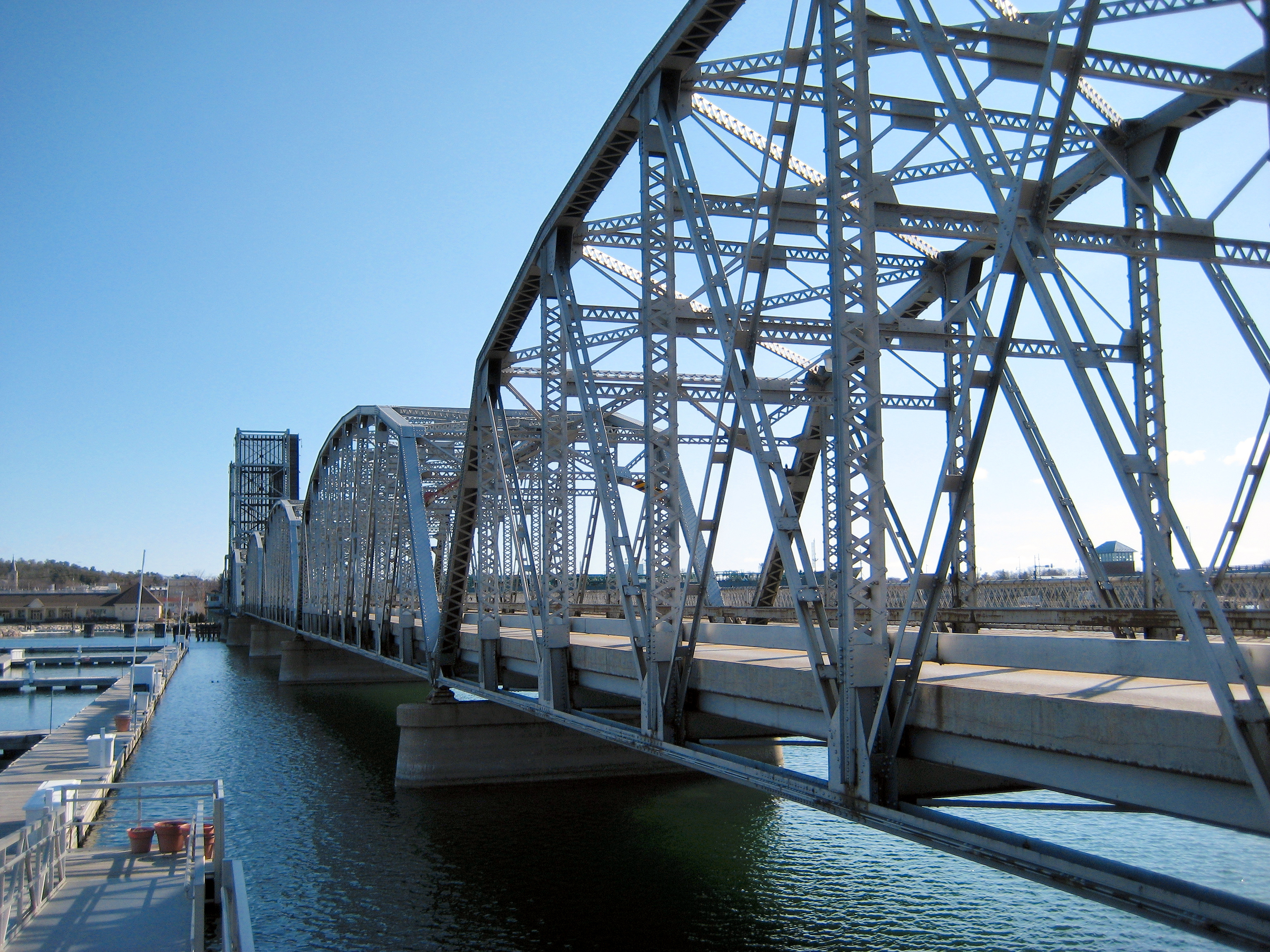
- The Sturgeon Bay Bridge in 2009, with the bascule draw span (at the far end) open
- Coordinates: 44°49′55″N 87°22′52″W
- Carries: Michigan Street
- Crosses: Sturgeon Bay, to the southeast of Dunlap Reef
- Locale: Sturgeon Bay, Wisconsin
- Other name: Michigan Street Bridge

Characteristics
- Design: Bascule
- Material: Steel
- Total length: 1,420 feet (430 m)
- Width: 24.0 feet (7.3 m)
- Clearance above: 11.5 feet (3.5 m)

History
- Designer: Harrington Keller
- Opened: 1931
- Sturgeon Bay Bridge
- U.S. National Register of Historic Places
- Location within Wisconsin Location within the United States
- Nearest city: Sturgeon Bay, Wisconsin
- Coordinates: 44°49′55″N 87°22′52″W
- Built: 1930–1931
- NRHP reference No.: 07001420
- Added to NRHP: January 17, 2008
- Rebuilt: 2009-2010 (walkway)
- Closed: 2009-2011 (temporarily)
- Replaces: Ahnapee & Western Railroad Bridge

Statistics
- Daily traffic: 5,700 (2020)

Location
- Interactive map of Sturgeon Bay Bridge

The Sturgeon Bay Bridge (known as the Michigan Street Bridge) is a historic bridge in Sturgeon Bay, Wisconsin, United States. The bridge was built in 1929 and opened July 4, 1931, with a grand parade where it was officially dedicated as a Door County Veterans Memorial which plaques at either end still reads "To honor those who gave of themselves, to their country, in times of need" as a gift by the State of Wisconsin. It was the only bridge linking the mainland to northern Door County after the train/toll bridge was discontinued. The Sturgeon Bay Bridge was listed on the National Register of Historic Places on January 17, 2008, for its unique upper rolling lift bascule and length. After a ten-year battle to save the bridge from demolition and replace in-kind, it was determined by the state to add a second bridge as a sister to meet safety standards. In September 2008, after the opening of a new, parallel, two-lane sister bridge was opened one block away at Oregon Street, the historic bridge was temporarily closed to allow for restoration work to commence. Federal safety standards required four-lane replacement in order to accommodate the heavy traffic loads and congestion caused by the bridge's 3,000 openings annually. The historic bridge and new bridge operate as one system. The historic bridge was reopened in the spring of 2011.

== History ==
The Sturgeon Bay Bridge opened July 4, 1931. At the time of its opening, it was the second bridge in Sturgeon Bay, the first being the toll bridge to the north that also carried the Ahnapee and Western railroad line across the bay. The historic Sturgeon Bay Bridge carried Wisconsin Highway 42 and Wisconsin Highway 57 until the Bay View Bridge was built in 1978. The two highways were rerouted onto the Bay View Bridge in order to bypass Sturgeon Bay. Subsequently, the Sturgeon Bay Bridge was designated as Wisconsin Business Highway 42/57.

The Sturgeon Bay Bridge underwent a major rehabilitation in 1979. By the 1990s, the bridge became notorious for needing maintenance; a Wisconsin Department of Transportation spokesman said in 1999 that "we have been maintaining this bridge since it was built". The bridge was closed several times for repairs in the late 1990s, and the state began to look at plans to replace the bridge. The state's plans prompted the Citizens for Our Bridge to list the bridge onto the National Register and Wisconsin Trust for Historic Preservation to list it as one of the ten most endangered sites in Wisconsin. In 2002, the city of Sturgeon Bay and the state of Wisconsin agreed to build a second bridge in downtown Sturgeon Bay to avoid traffic congestion and cutting off northern Door County if the Michigan Street Bridge closed for repairs. The state agreed to designate the original bridge as a state business highway in 2003, allowing the state to construct and own a replacement bridge which marked another step towards the construction of a second bridge. After a city referendum in 2005, Wisconsin Governor Jim Doyle signed a bill to fund a second downtown bridge, and construction soon began on a bridge connecting Maple and Oregon streets.

Due to the state decision to replace the Historic Sturgeon Bay Bridge, a historic preservationist group called Citizens for Our Bridge formed to protect the bridge by raising community awareness in order to secure funding for its restoration. The group sponsored a benefit concert, the Steel Bridge Songfest, in 2005; the concert was headlined by Jackson Browne and Green Bay native Pat MacDonald. Citizens for Our Bridge has held the concert annually since 2005; the 2009 concert included 150 performers, including Jane Wiedlin, James McMurtry, Freedy Johnston, Victor DeLorenzo, and Louise Goffin.

While the second bridge was being built, the Sturgeon Bay Bridge continued to fall into disrepair, and maintenance became urgently needed. A 2007 bridge inspection assessed the bridge as structurally deficient, mainly due to its size and presumed poor superstructure and substructure. In July 2008, the bridge was closed to all traffic for two days after the Wisconsin Department of Transportation stated that the weight limit was not being enforced, though it was reopened after two days. Once the Maple and Oregon Street Bridge opened on September 22, 2008, the Sturgeon Bay Bridge closed to all traffic again so repair work could be done. In 2008, the Wisconsin Department of Transportation announced its plan to restore the bridge due to its historic significance and construct a second sister bridge. In December 2010 the bridge was reopened to foot and vehicle traffic. The bridge was then re-opened in spring 2011 to foot and vehicle traffic after painting was completed. Newer features to the bridge include LED lights, traffic signals, and CCTV cameras. The bridge also transitioned from manual openings to remote controlled operations.

From 2011 through May 2021 there have been 13 vehicle accidents on the bridge, out of which three involved teen drivers. Two of total accidents involved a driver who was 65 or older and two accidents involved alcohol. None of the accidents involved apparent injuries; they were considered property damage incidents only. In 2012, a recreational vehicle was hit by the bridge due to an operator error.

On October 6, 2021, a truck crossing the bridge struck several of the braces on the bridge with the load it was carrying. The Wisconsin DOT inspected the bridge and reopened to traffic the same day.

== Traffic comparison ==
Average daily traffic by year; bridge traffic monitors at Michigan and Oregon streets

View chart definition.
Traffic count on Bridges. Notes: data is unavailable from 2009–2010 for both bridges and in 2011 for Sturgeon Bay Bridge

== Gallery ==
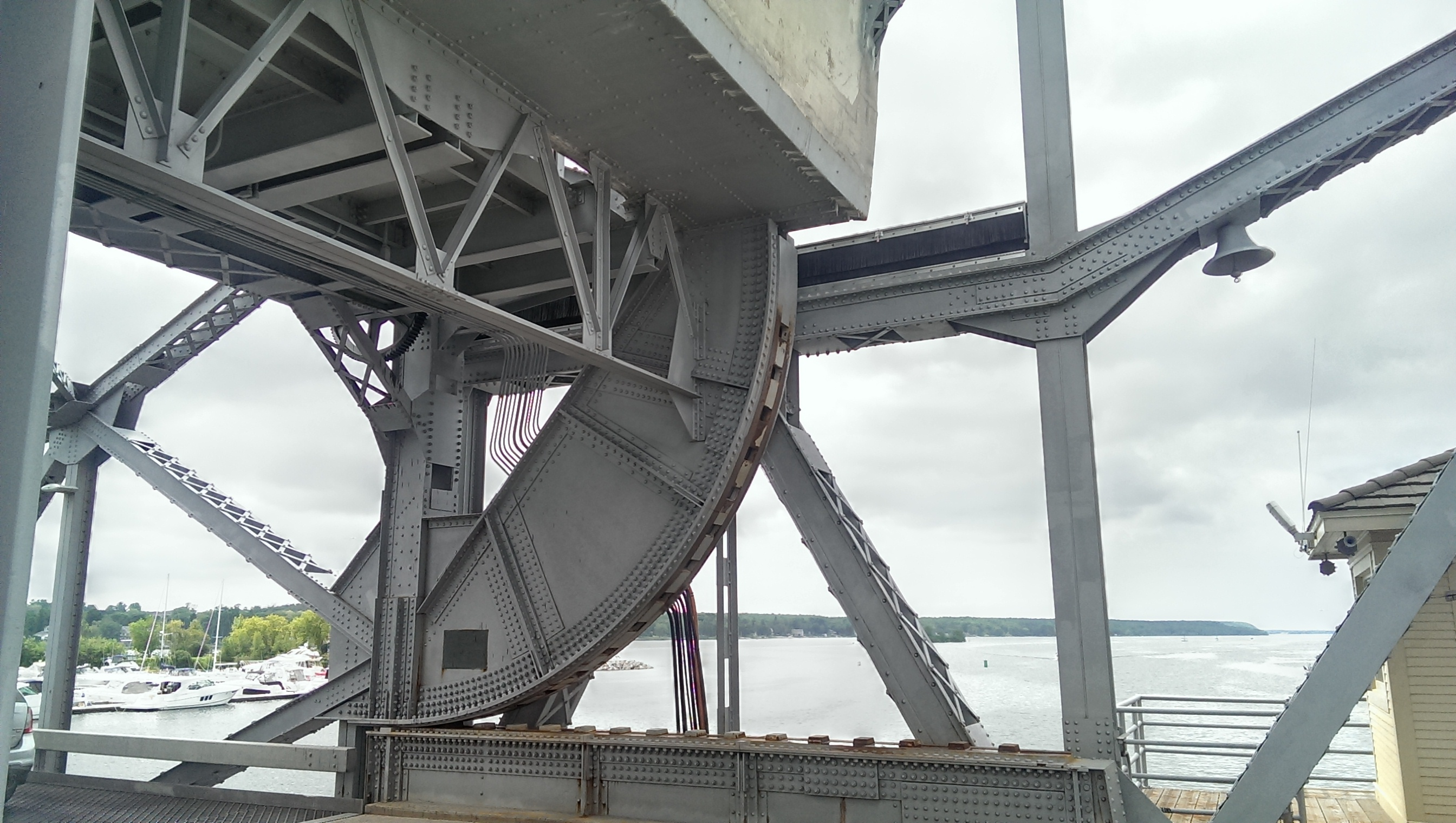
Track and roll for the Scherzer-type lifting mechanism

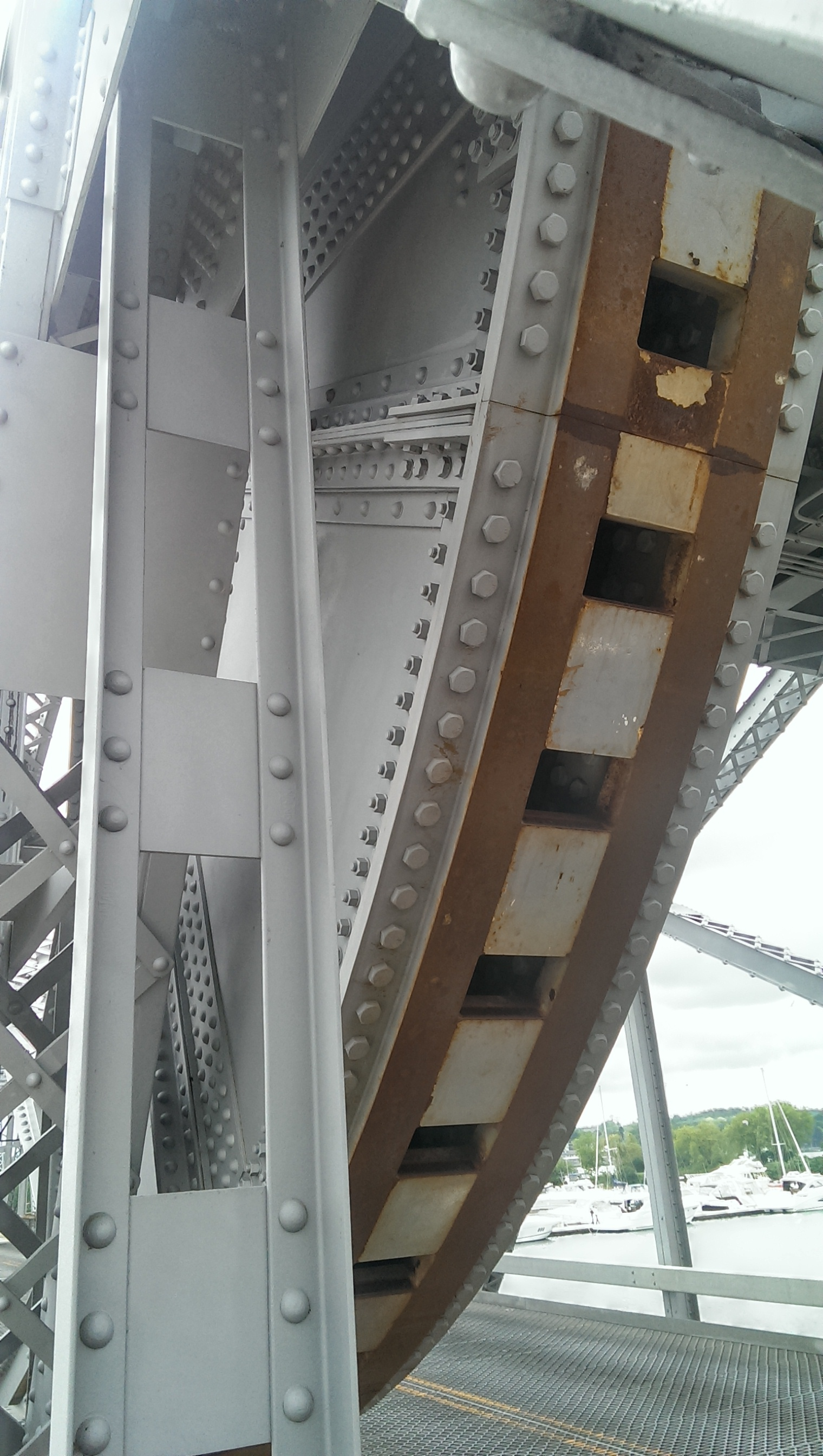
Tread on the edge of a roll

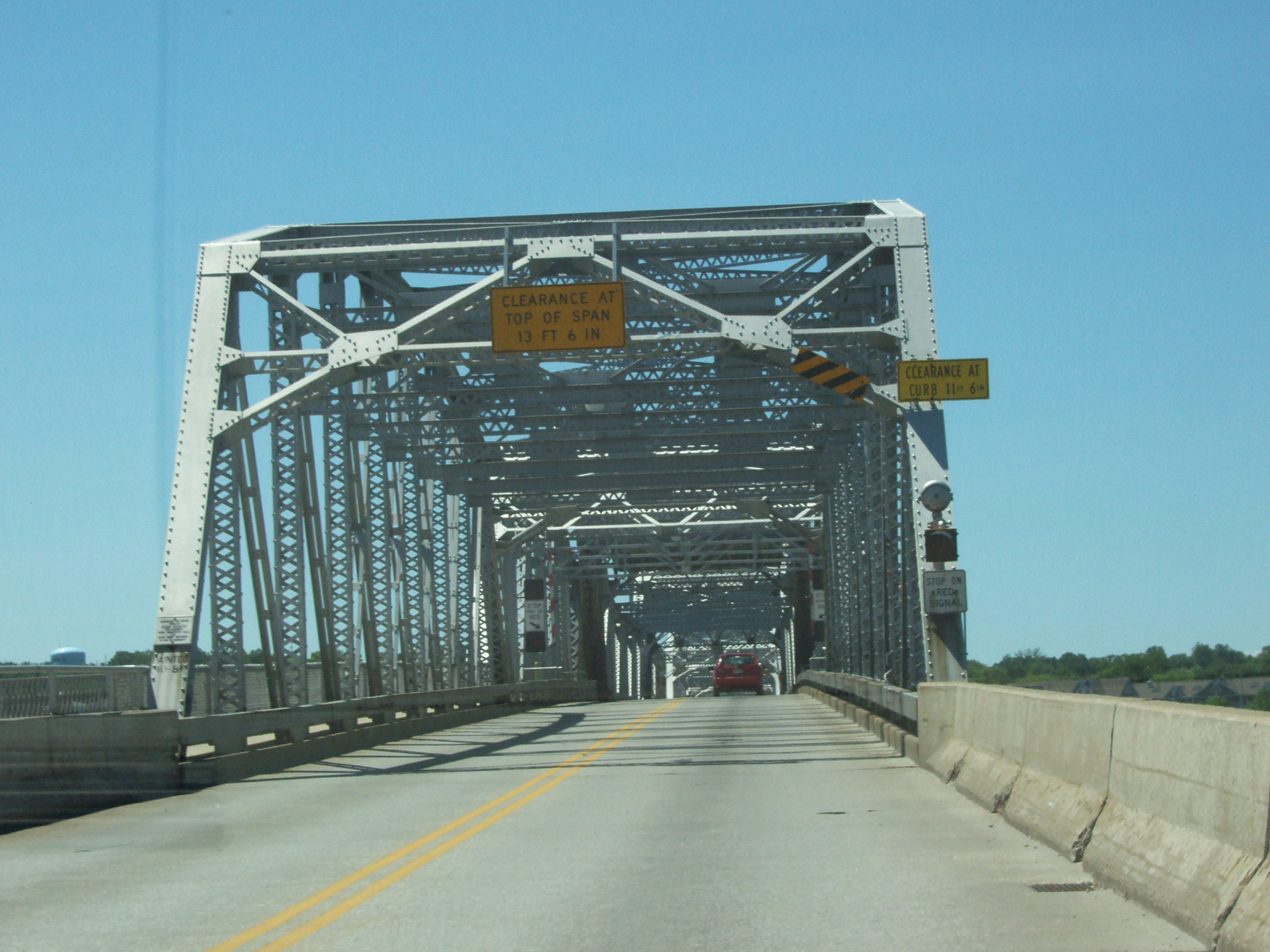
Driving onto the bridge

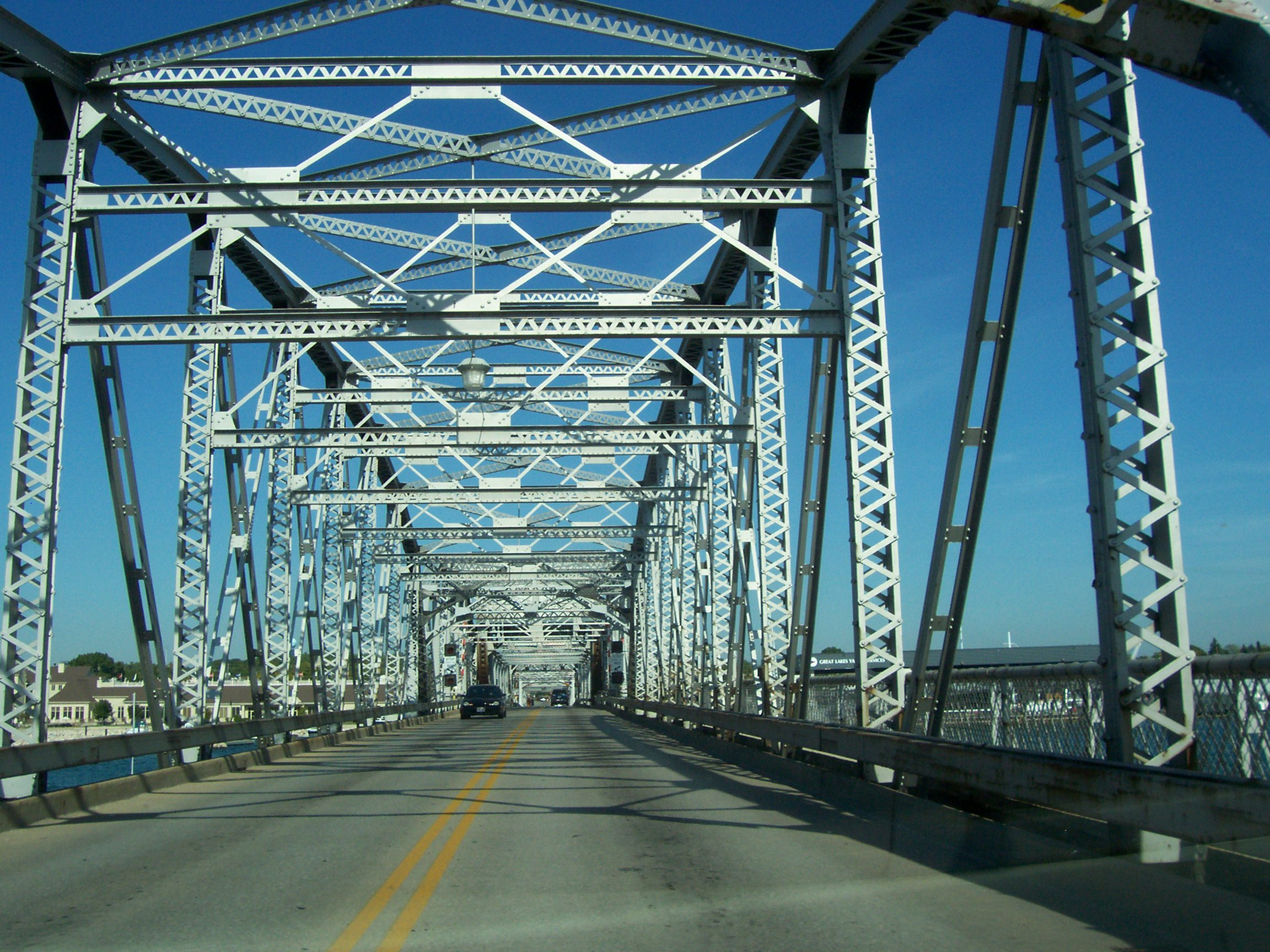
Inside the bridge

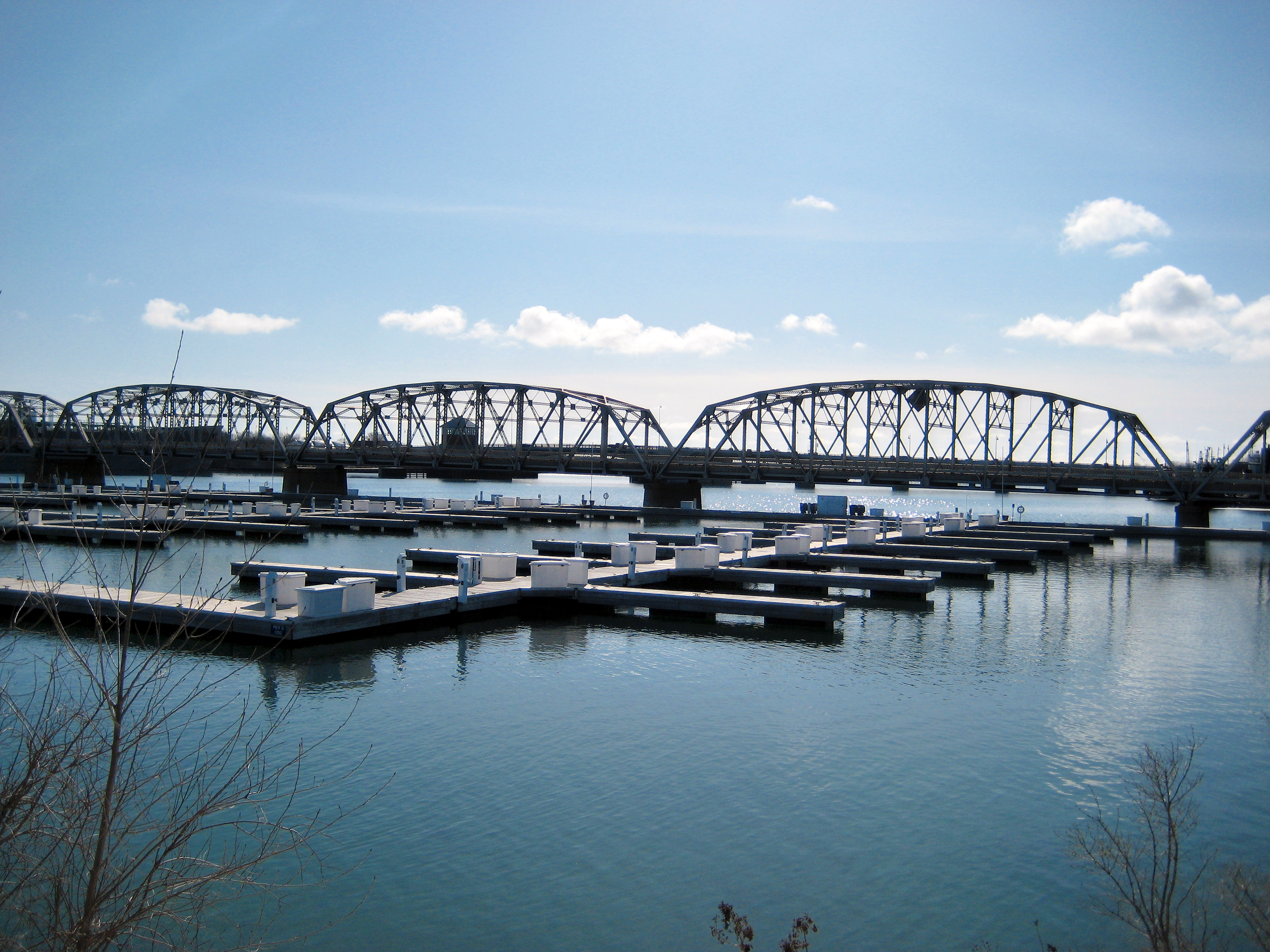
A side view of the bridge in March 2009

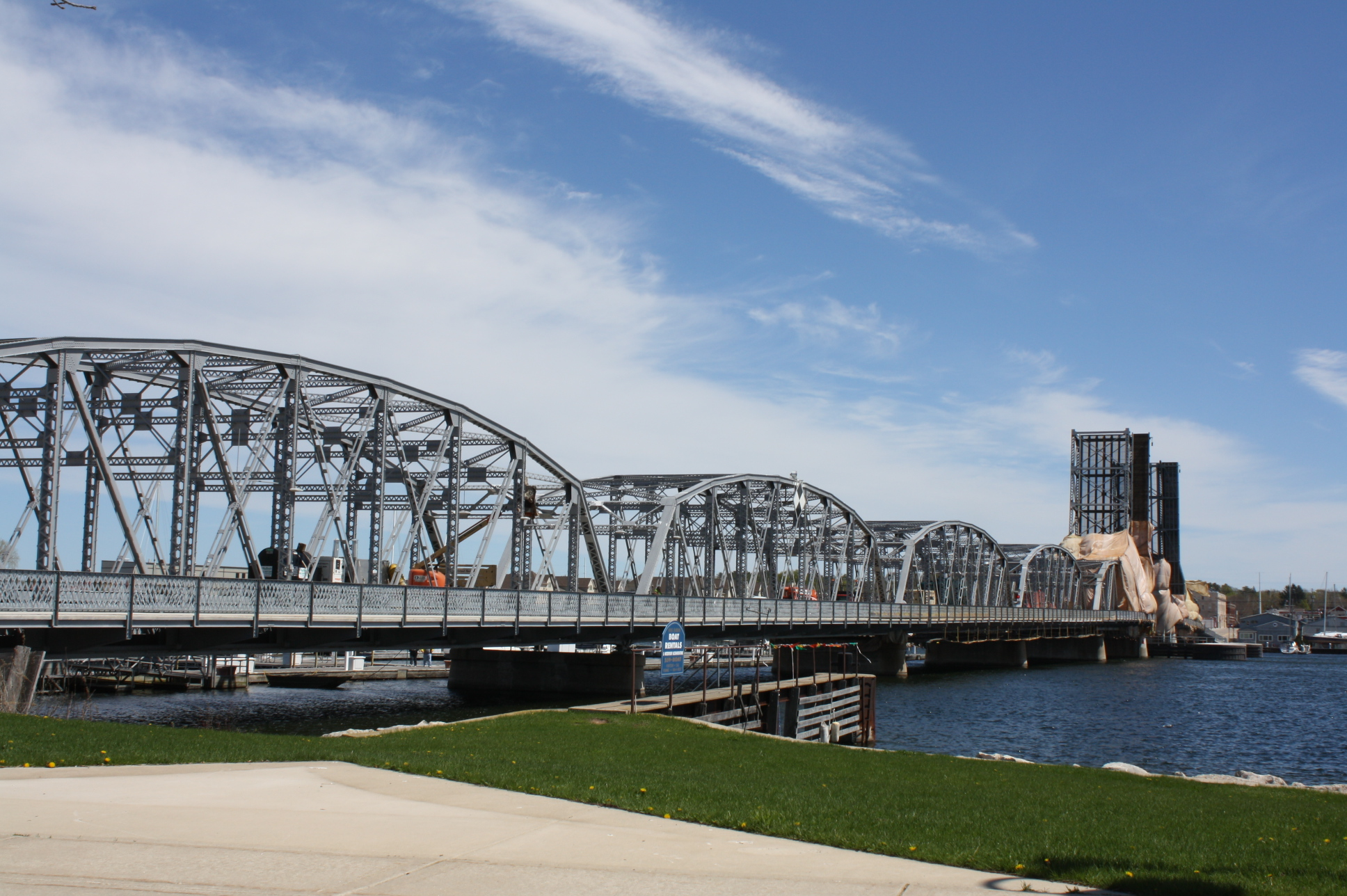
Repainting in May 2011

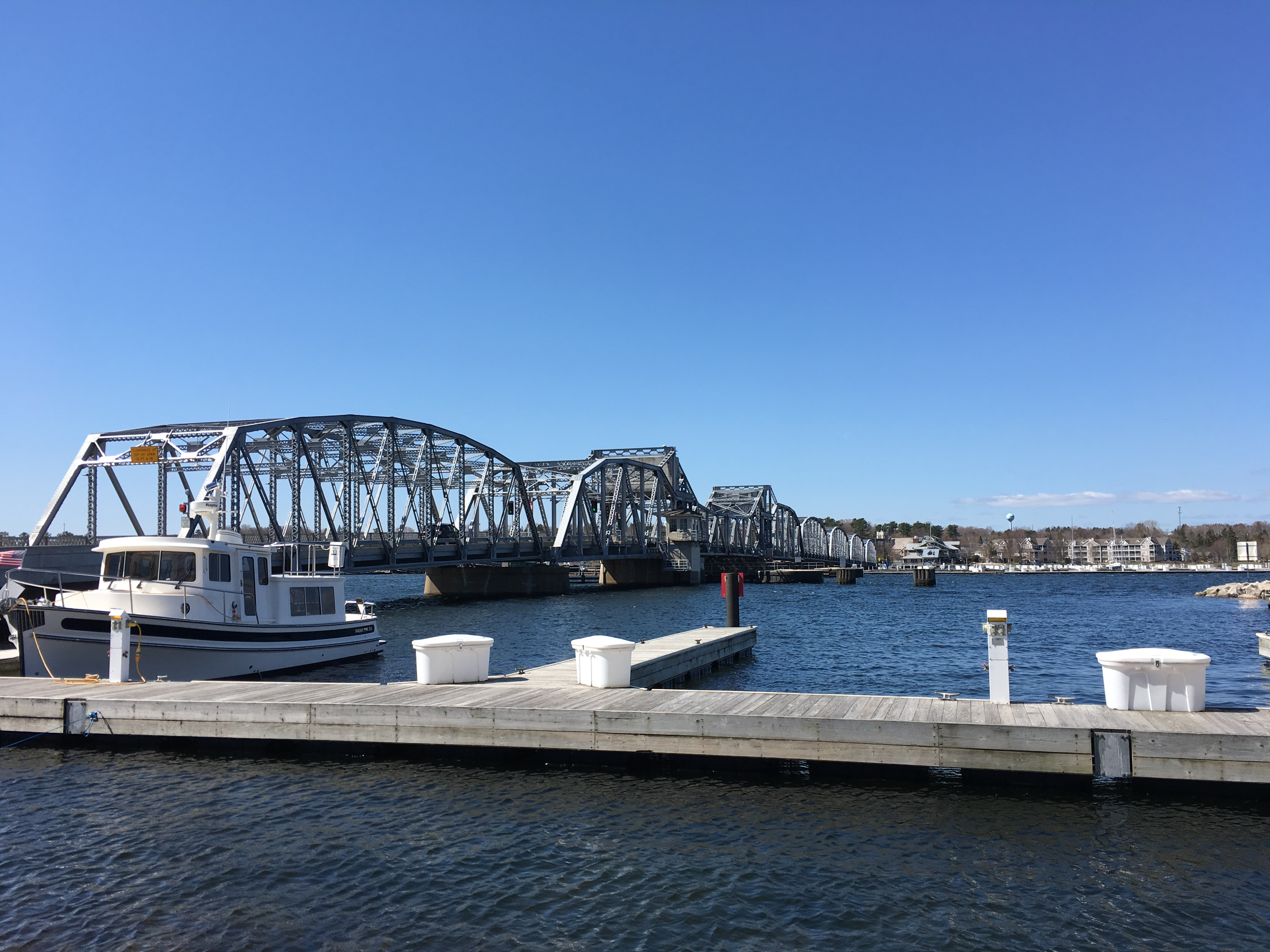
Bridge on April 26th, 2019

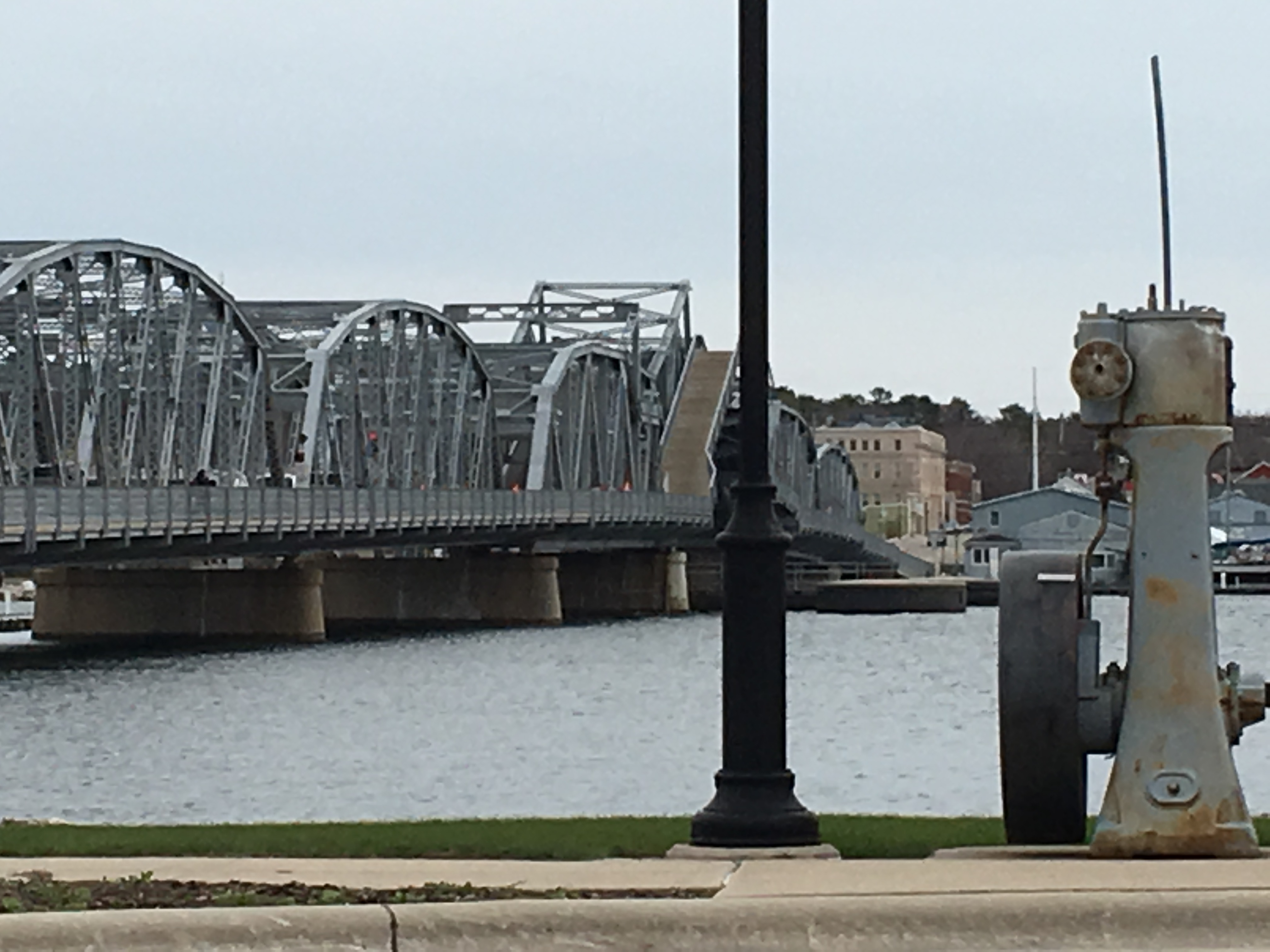
Bridge opening on April 27th, 2019

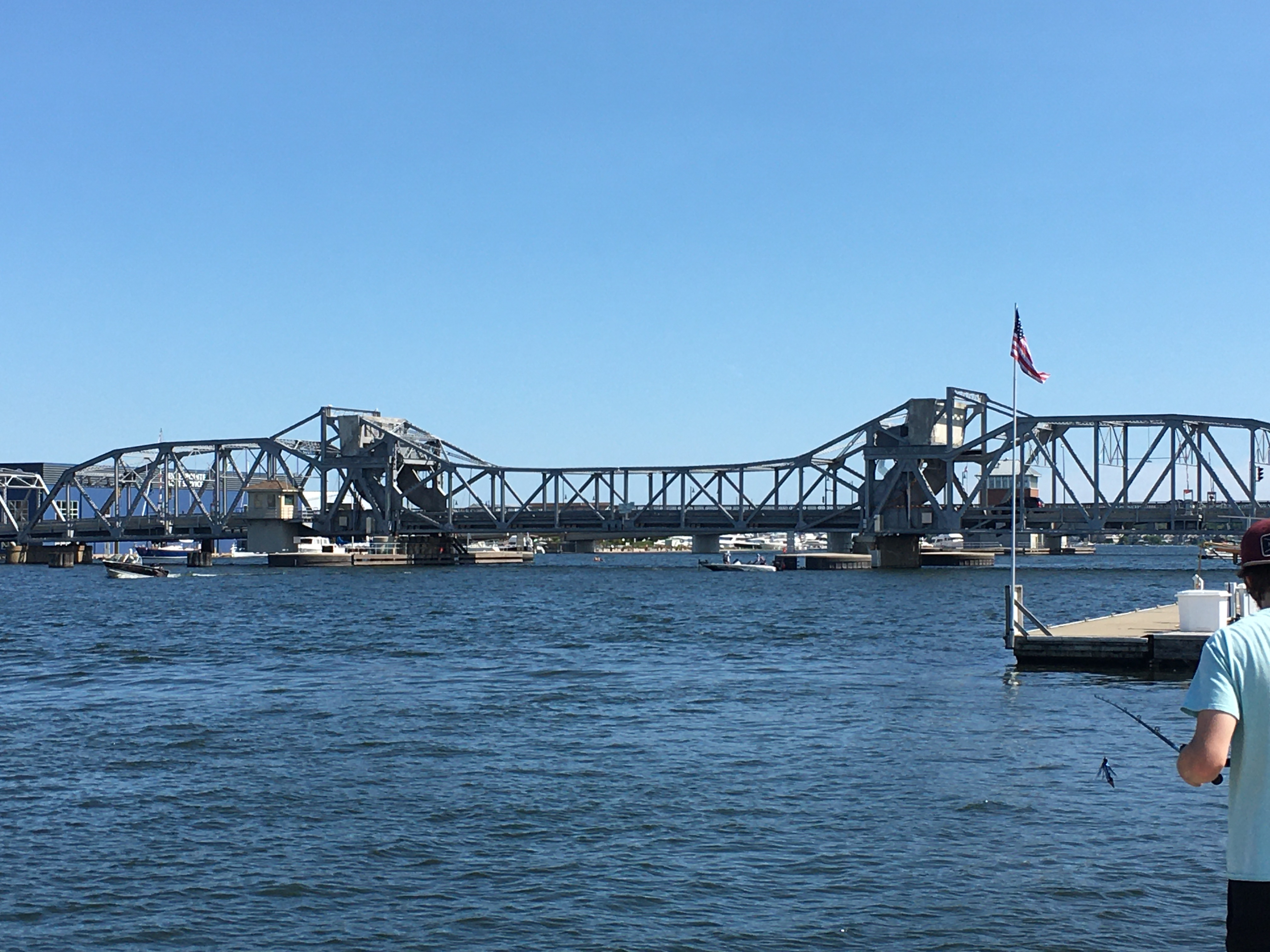
Sturgeon Bay Bridge in August 2020
