= Sturgeon Bay, Wisconsin =

- City
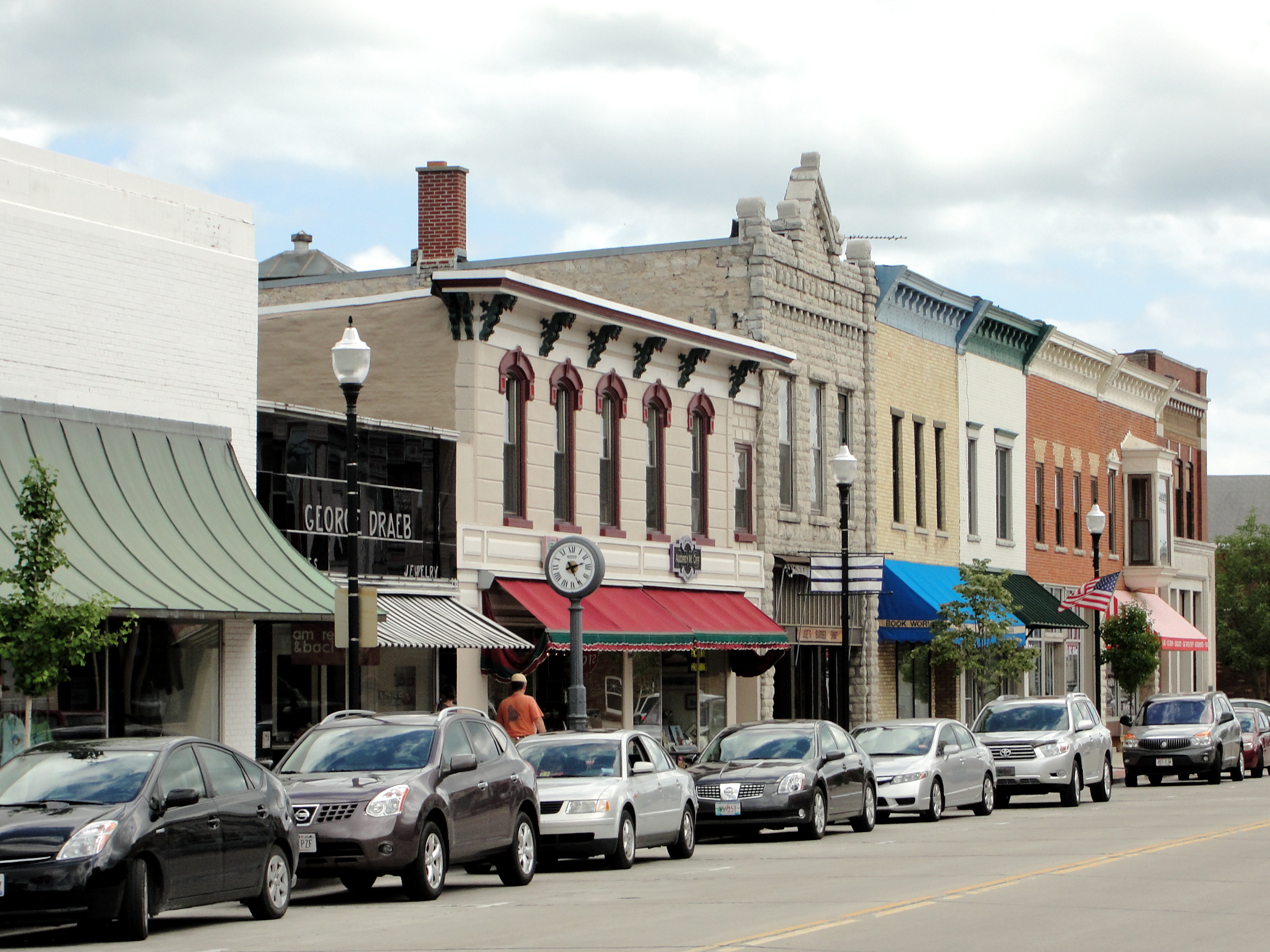
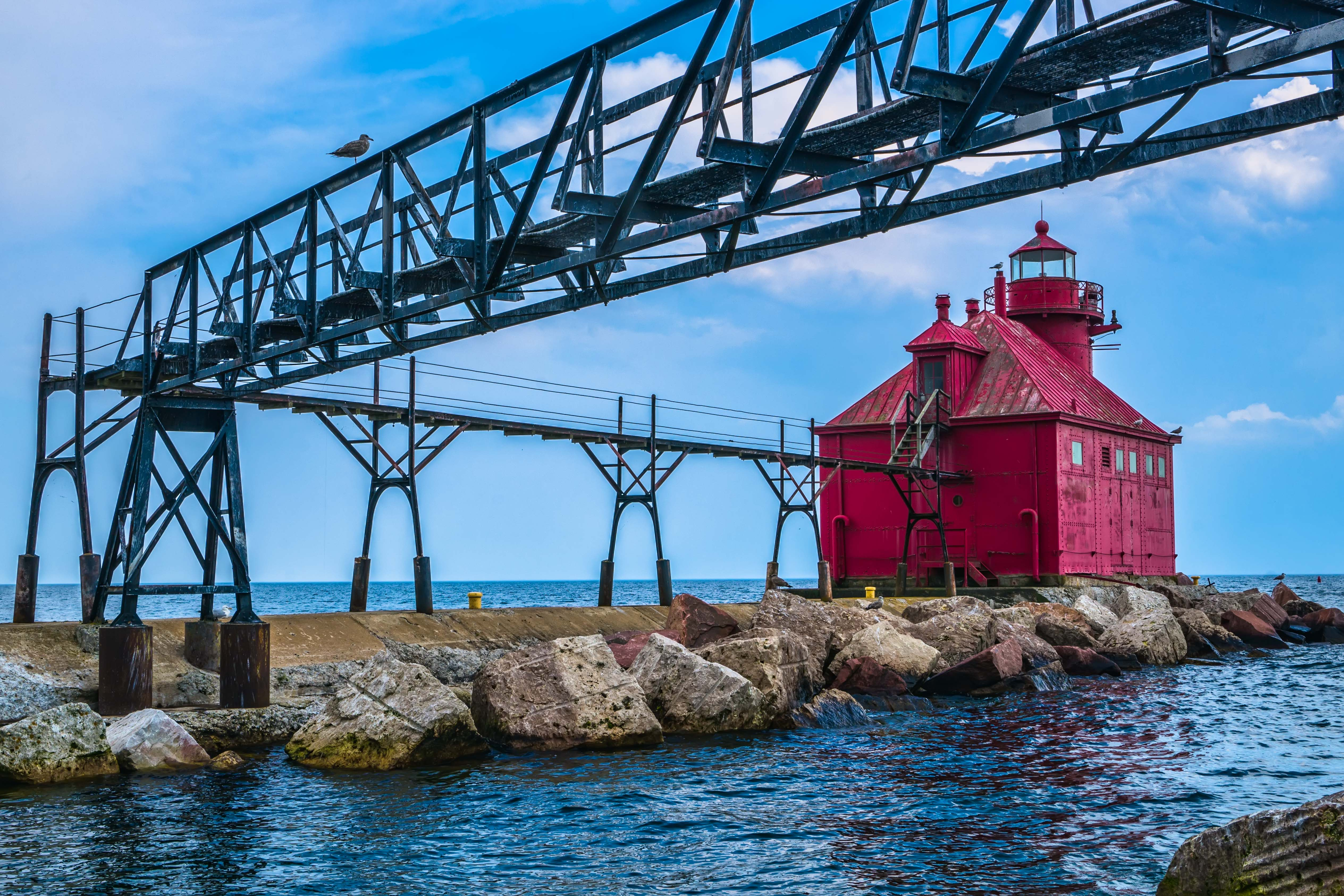
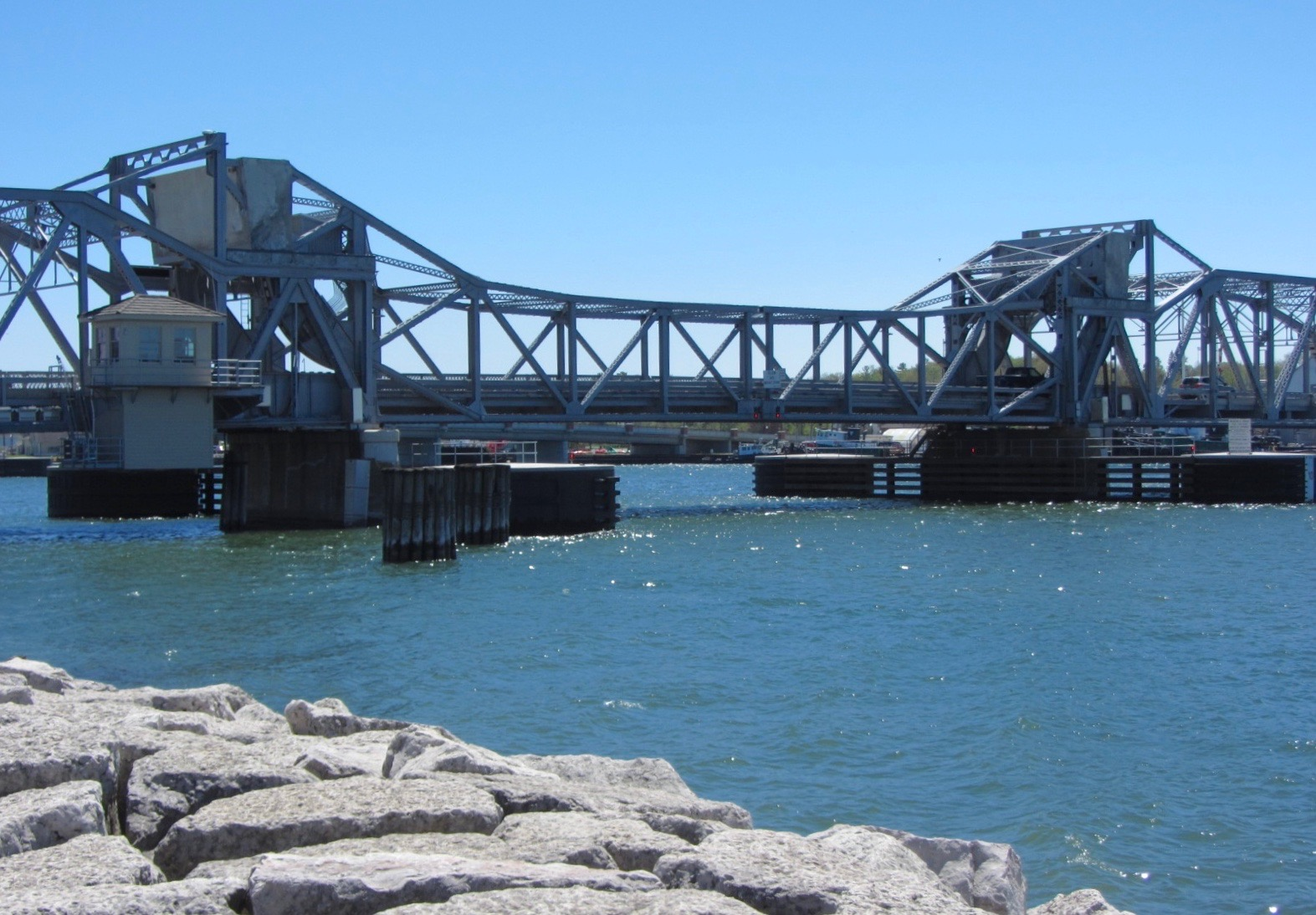
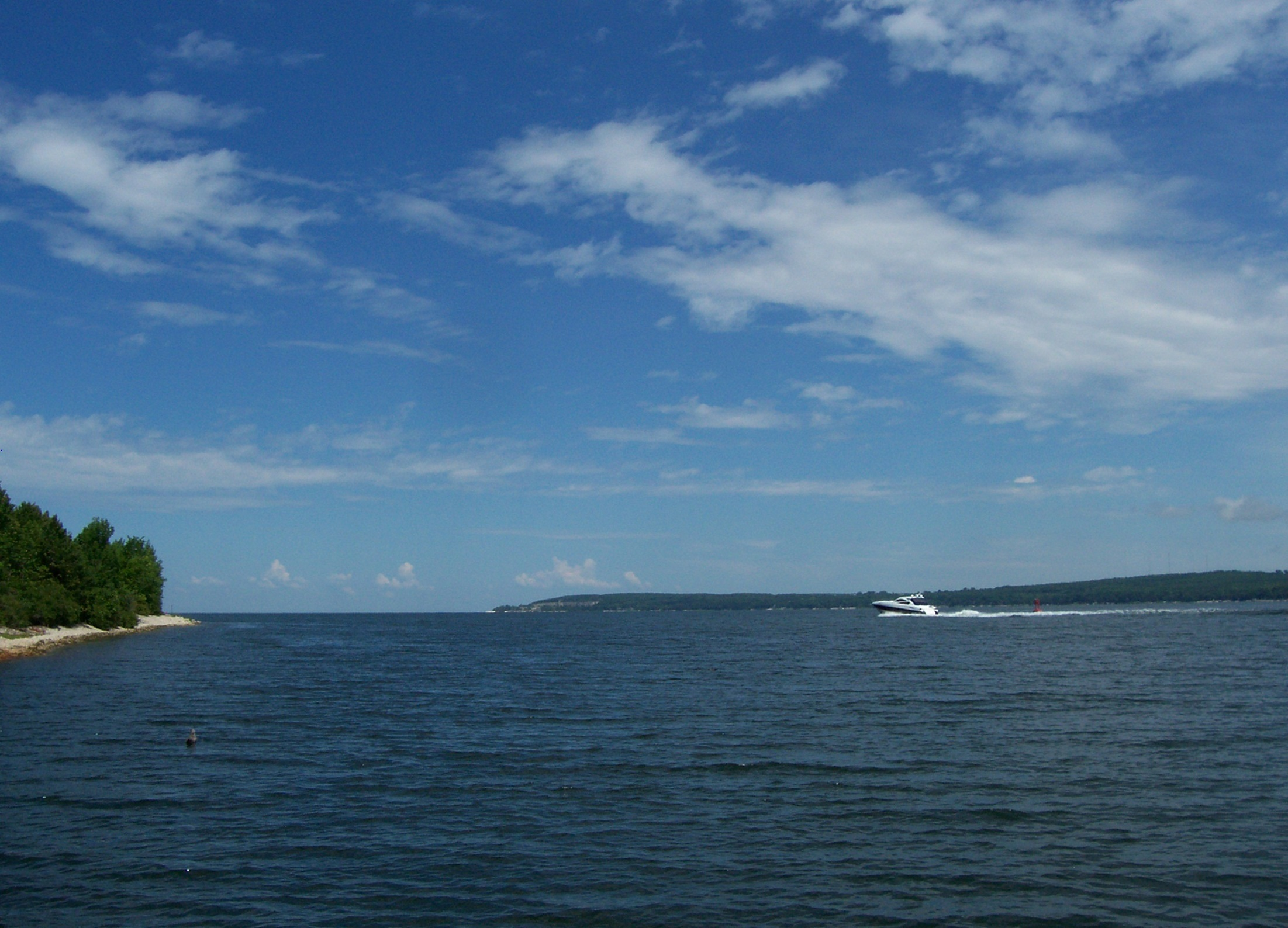
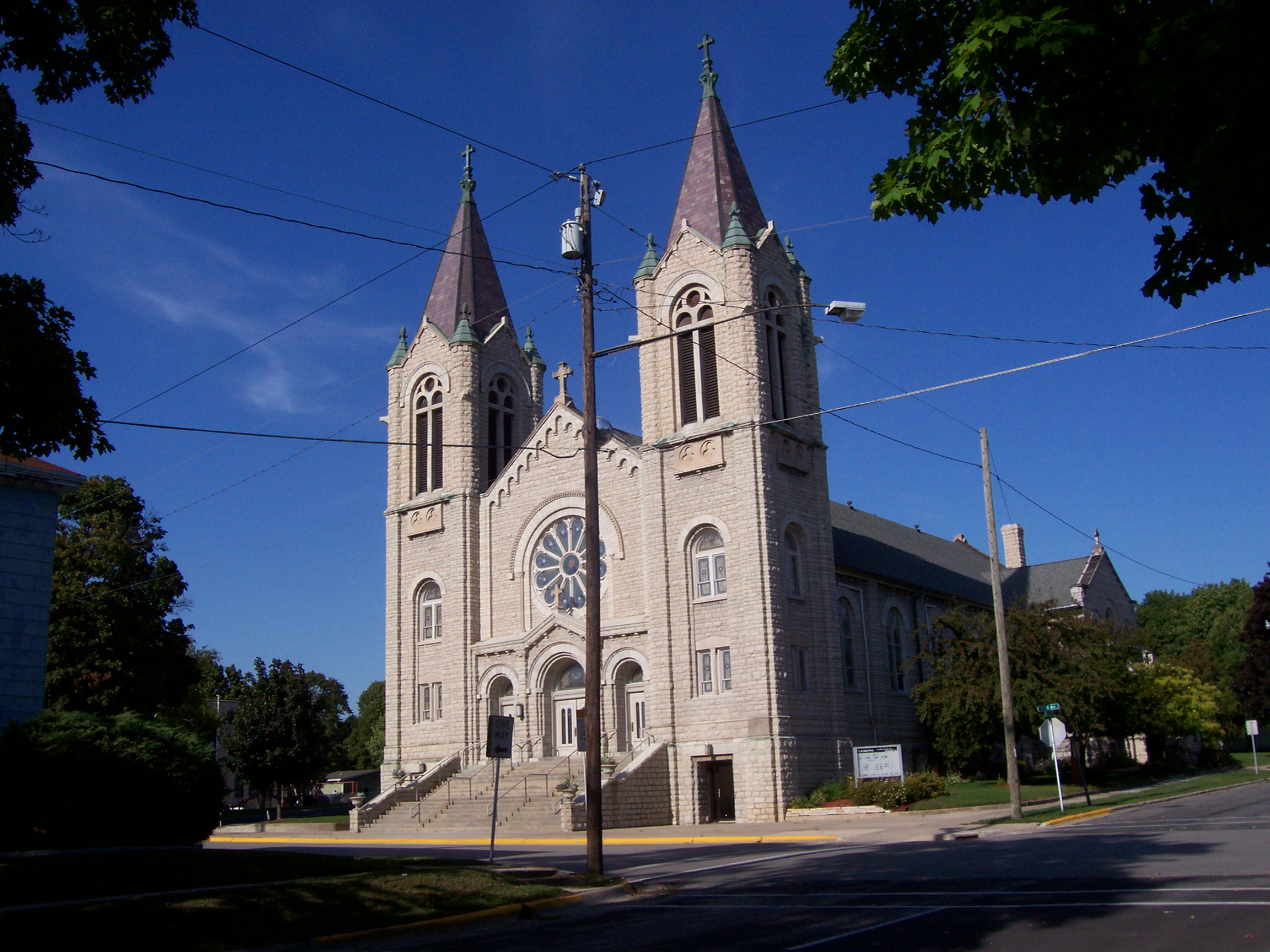
- Downtown Sturgeon Bay along 3rd Avenue North Pierhead Light Sturgeon Bay Bridge Bay of Sturgeon Bay St Josephs Catholic Church
- Nickname: Shipbuilding Capital of the Midwest
- Location of Sturgeon Bay in Door County, Wisconsin.

- Location within Wisconsin Location within the United States
- Coordinates: 44°50′01″N 87°22′40″W
- Country: United States
- State: Wisconsin
- County: Door

Government
  - Mayor: David Ward

Area
  - Total: 11.49 sq mi (29.77 km^{2})
  - Land: 9.83 sq mi (25.46 km^{2})
  - Water: 1.66 sq mi (4.31 km^{2})

Population (2020)
  - Total: 9,646
  - Density: 908.9/sq mi (350.92/km^{2})
- Time zone: UTC−6 (Central (CST))
  - Summer (DST): UTC−5 (CDT)
- Zip Code: 54235
- Area code: 920
- FIPS code: 55-77875
- Website: www.sturgeonbaywi.org

Sturgeon Bay is a city in Door County, Wisconsin, United States, and its county seat. The population was 9,646 at the 2020 census. Located at the bay of Sturgeon Bay for which it is named, it is the most populous city on the Door Peninsula, a popular Upper Midwest vacation destination.

== History ==
The area was originally inhabited by the Ho-Chunk and Menominee. The town is known in the Menominee language as Namāēw-Wīhkit, or "bay of the sturgeon". The Menominee ceded this territory to the United States in the 1831 Treaty of Washington. After that, the area was available for white settlement.

The community was first recorded as Graham in 1855, but in 1857, the state legislature organized it as the town of Ottumba. Subsequently, the name was reverted to Graham, and in 1860, a petition was submitted to the county board to change the community's name to that of the adjacent bay. A company of volunteer firefighters was established in 1869. In 1874, Sturgeon Bay was incorporated as a village. It became a city in 1883, and the police department was founded that year. In 1891, Charles Mitchell Whiteside, a member of the Wisconsin Assembly, sponsored a bill that merged the community of Sawyer with Sturgeon Bay.

The city is locally known for the Sturgeon Bay Bridge at Michigan Street, which at the time of its 1931 opening was the second across the bay and carried the former route of WIS 17 (now WIS 42 and WIS 57/78).

Sturgeon Bay was one of a number of cities in the Midwest to assist with production during World War II. In 1943, many streets received new names. The former names of some streets are stenciled into older sidewalks.

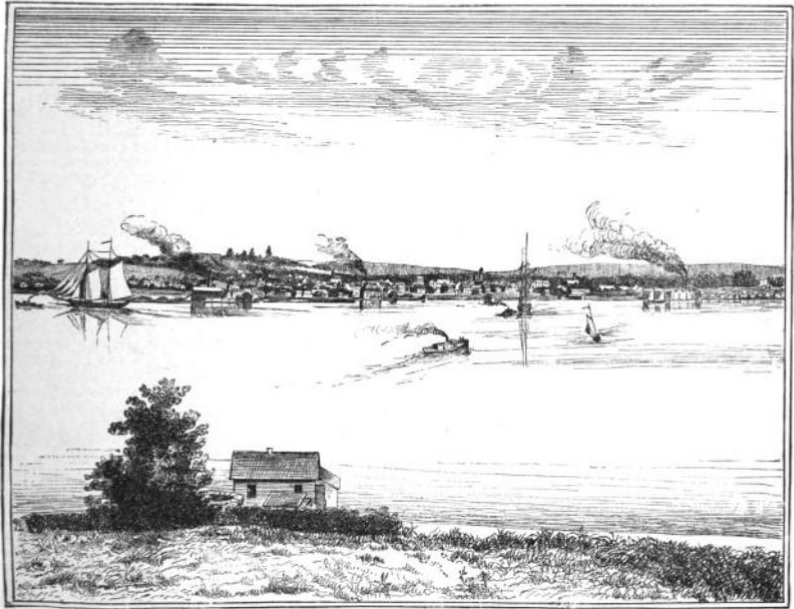
Sturgeon Bay, 1881, depicting different kinds of vessels

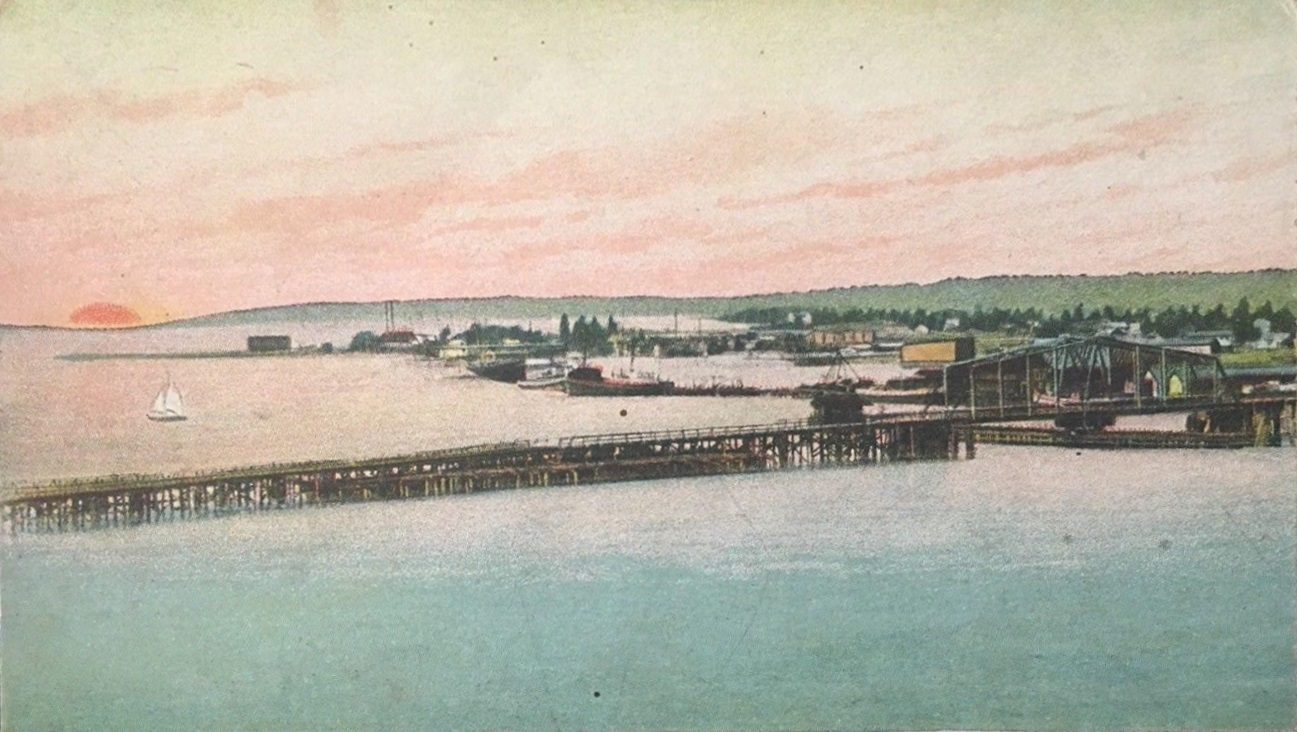
Aerial view of Sturgeon Bay c. 1908

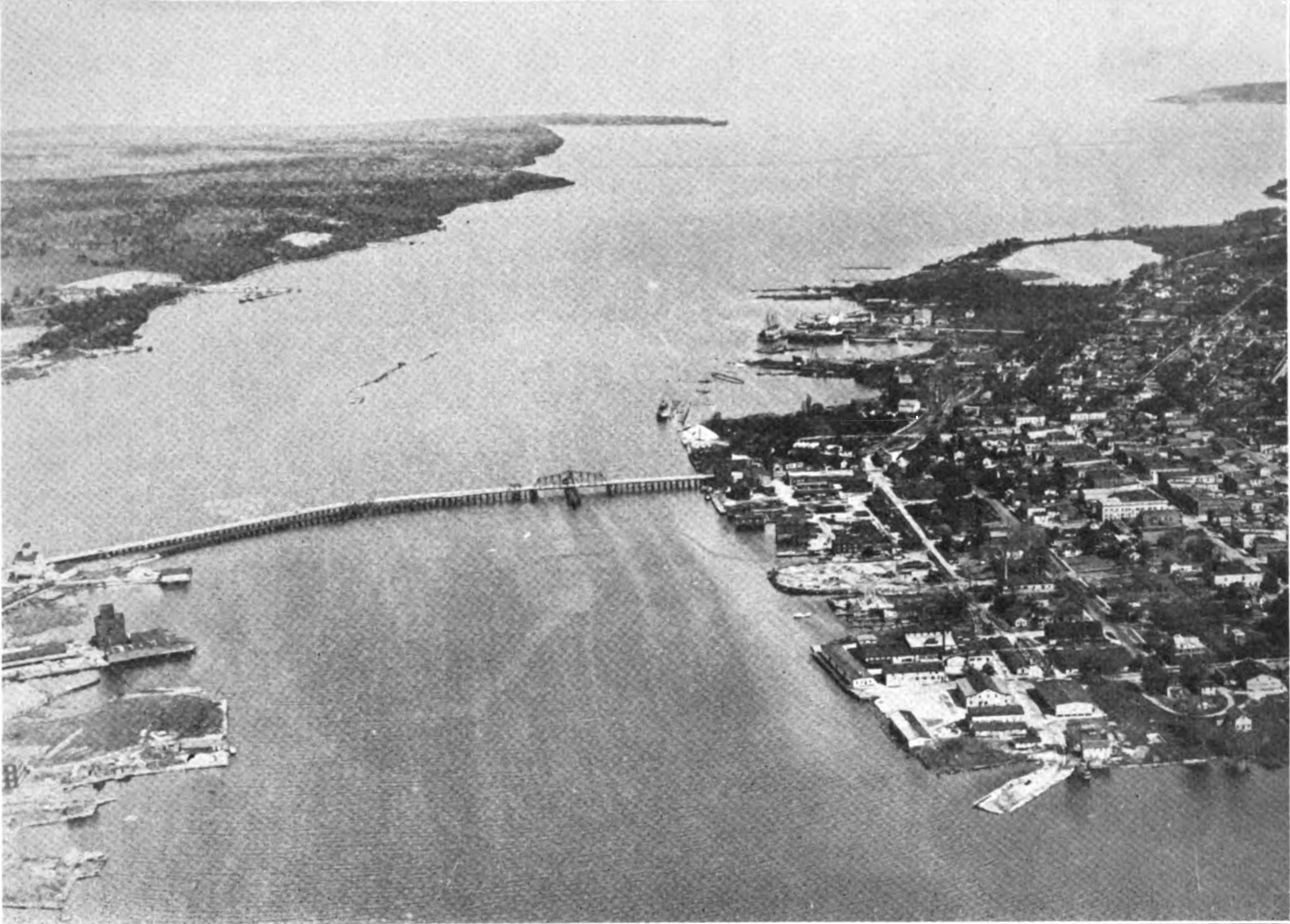
Sturgeon Bay, from a book published in 1930

== Geography ==
At 584 feet (178 m) above sea level, Sturgeon Bay is located at 44°49′56″N 87°22′19″W (44.813376, −87.372076). According to the United States Census Bureau, the city has a total area of 11.66 square miles (30.20 km^{2}), of which 9.82 square miles (25.43 km^{2}) is land and 1.84 square miles (4.77 km^{2}) is water.

Sturgeon Bay is at the natural end of Sturgeon Bay. The Sturgeon Bay Ship Canal was built across the remainder of the Door Peninsula. It is one of several cities along Green Bay, including Green Bay, Marinette and Escanaba, Michigan, and along Lake Michigan north of Manitowoc and south of Manistique, Michigan.

Sturgeon Bay is 38.4 miles (61.8 km) north of Green Bay, 127 miles (204 km) north of Milwaukee, 169 miles (272 km) south of Houghton, Michigan and 289 miles (465 km) east of Minneapolis. Although Marinette is 21.9 miles (35.2 km) away, people must physically travel towards the bottom of the bay by Green Bay and travel along or nearby the western shore of Green Bay.

=== Stevens Hill ===
Stevens Hill is a populated place within the city of Sturgeon Bay, just to the northeast of the downtown. The top of the hill has the highest elevation in the city. It is within Big Hill Park, which is 13.2 acres in area and is used for mountain biking, picnicking, and sledding.

=== Climate ===
Sturgeon Bay has a humid continental climate (Köppen: Dfb).

Climate data for Sturgeon Bay, Wisconsin, 1991–2020 normals, extremes 1905–present
Month	Jan	Feb	Mar	Apr	May	Jun	Jul	Aug	Sep	Oct	Nov	Dec	Year
Record high °F (°C)	55 (13)	58 (14)	76 (24)	85 (29)	91 (33)	100 (38)	105 (41)	102 (39)	96 (36)	86 (30)	74 (23)	60 (16)	105 (41)
Mean maximum °F (°C)	42.2 (5.7)	45.0 (7.2)	58.4 (14.7)	70.6 (21.4)	80.3 (26.8)	87.3 (30.7)	89.3 (31.8)	88.3 (31.3)	83.9 (28.8)	74.6 (23.7)	59.2 (15.1)	46.7 (8.2)	91.3 (32.9)
Mean daily maximum °F (°C)	25.2 (−3.8)	28.1 (−2.2)	37.9 (3.3)	50.1 (10.1)	62.4 (16.9)	72.6 (22.6)	78.0 (25.6)	76.8 (24.9)	69.4 (20.8)	55.9 (13.3)	42.4 (5.8)	31.1 (−0.5)	52.5 (11.4)
Daily mean °F (°C)	17.8 (−7.9)	20.0 (−6.7)	29.6 (−1.3)	41.0 (5.0)	52.5 (11.4)	62.8 (17.1)	68.4 (20.2)	67.5 (19.7)	59.9 (15.5)	47.7 (8.7)	35.6 (2.0)	24.8 (−4.0)	44.0 (6.6)
Mean daily minimum °F (°C)	10.4 (−12.0)	11.9 (−11.2)	21.3 (−5.9)	32.0 (0.0)	42.5 (5.8)	52.9 (11.6)	58.8 (14.9)	58.2 (14.6)	50.7 (10.4)	39.4 (4.1)	28.9 (−1.7)	18.5 (−7.5)	35.5 (1.9)
Mean minimum °F (°C)	−7.9 (−22.2)	−6.4 (−21.3)	1.9 (−16.7)	20.3 (−6.5)	30.8 (−0.7)	40.2 (4.6)	47.7 (8.7)	46.6 (8.1)	37.4 (3.0)	28.1 (−2.2)	15.8 (−9.0)	1.2 (−17.1)	−11.3 (−24.1)
Record low °F (°C)	−29 (−34)	−29 (−34)	−23 (−31)	2 (−17)	20 (−7)	29 (−2)	36 (2)	32 (0)	26 (−3)	12 (−11)	−6 (−21)	−22 (−30)	−29 (−34)
Average precipitation inches (mm)	1.71 (43)	1.34 (34)	1.90 (48)	3.07 (78)	3.32 (84)	4.12 (105)	3.57 (91)	3.32 (84)	3.10 (79)	3.24 (82)	2.20 (56)	1.97 (50)	32.86 (834)
Average snowfall inches (cm)	15.6 (40)	12.9 (33)	8.6 (22)	4.0 (10)	0.0 (0.0)	0.0 (0.0)	0.0 (0.0)	0.0 (0.0)	0.0 (0.0)	0.2 (0.51)	2.4 (6.1)	13.7 (35)	57.4 (146.61)
Average extreme snow depth inches (cm)	14 (36)	16 (41)	12 (30)	3 (7.6)	0 (0)	0 (0)	0 (0)	0 (0)	0 (0)	0 (0)	1 (2.5)	9 (23)	16 (41)
Average precipitation days (≥ 0.01 in)	11.0	8.3	8.6	10.3	12.3	11.0	11.2	9.6	10.1	11.3	9.5	10.4	123.6
Average snowy days (≥ 0.1 in)	7.3	6.0	4.0	1.7	0.0	0.0	0.0	0.0	0.0	0.1	1.7	5.8	26.6
Source 1: NOAA
Source 2: National Weather Service

== Demographics ==
Historical population
Census	Pop.	Note	%±
1880	1,199		—
1890	2,195		83.1%
1900	3,372		53.6%
1910	4,262		26.4%
1920	4,553		6.8%
1930	4,983		9.4%
1940	5,439		9.2%
1950	7,054		29.7%
1960	7,353		4.2%
1970	6,776		−7.8%
1980	8,847		30.6%
1990	9,176		3.7%
2000	9,437		2.8%
2010	9,144		−3.1%
2020	9,646		5.5%
U.S. Decennial Census

=== 2010 census ===
At the 2010 census, there were 9,144 people, 4,288 households and 2,385 families. The population density was 931.2 per square mile (359.5/km^{2}). There were 4,903 housing units at an average density of 499.3 per square mile (192.8/km^{2}). The racial make-up was 95.1% White, 1.0% African American, 0.9% Native American, 0.6% Asian, 1.0% from other races, and 1.4% from two or more races. Hispanic or Latino people of any race were 2.7% of the population.

There were 4,288 households, of which 24.3% had children under the age of 18 living with them, 42.5% were married couples living together, 9.7% had a female householder with no husband present, 3.5% had a male householder with no wife present, and 44.4% were non-families. 38.9% of all households were made up of individuals, and 17.5% had someone living alone who was 65 years of age or older. The average household size was 2.07 and the average family size was 2.74.

The median age was 45.2 years. 19.8% of residents were under the age of 18; 7.4% were between the ages of 18 and 24; 22.5% were from 25 to 44; 31% were from 45 to 64; and 19.2% were 65 years of age or older. The sex make-up of the city was 48.1% male and 51.9% female.

=== 2000 census ===
At the 2000 census, there were 9,437 people, 4,048 households and 2,432 families residing in the city. The population density was 981.4 per square mile (378.9/km^{2}). There were 4,447 housing units at an average density of 462.5 per square mile (178.6/km^{2}). The racial make-up of the city was 97.22% White, 0.33% Black or African American, 0.78% Native American, 0.37% Asian, 0.02% Pacific Islander, 0.46% from other races, and 0.82% from two or more races. 1.28% of the population were Hispanic or Latino of any race.

There were 4,048 households, of which 28.7% had children under the age of 18 living with them, 42.81% were married couples living together, 9.0% had a female householder with no husband present, and 39.9% were non-families. 35.0% of all households were made up of individuals, and 15.8% had someone living alone who was 65 years of age or older. The average household size was 2.26 and the average family size was 2.92.

23.5% of the population were under the age of 18, 7.6% from 18 to 24, 26.6% from 25 to 44, 23.7% from 45 to 64, and 18.7% were 65 years of age or older. The median age was 40 years. For every 100 females, there were 92.4 males. For every 100 females age 18 and over, there were 88.0 males.

The median household income was $31,935 and the median family income was $45,084. Males had a median income of $31,879 and females $21,414. The per capita income was $18,899. About 5.5% of families and 7.7% of the population were below the poverty line, including 11.2% of those under age 18 and 8.3% of those age 65 or over.

== Arts and culture ==
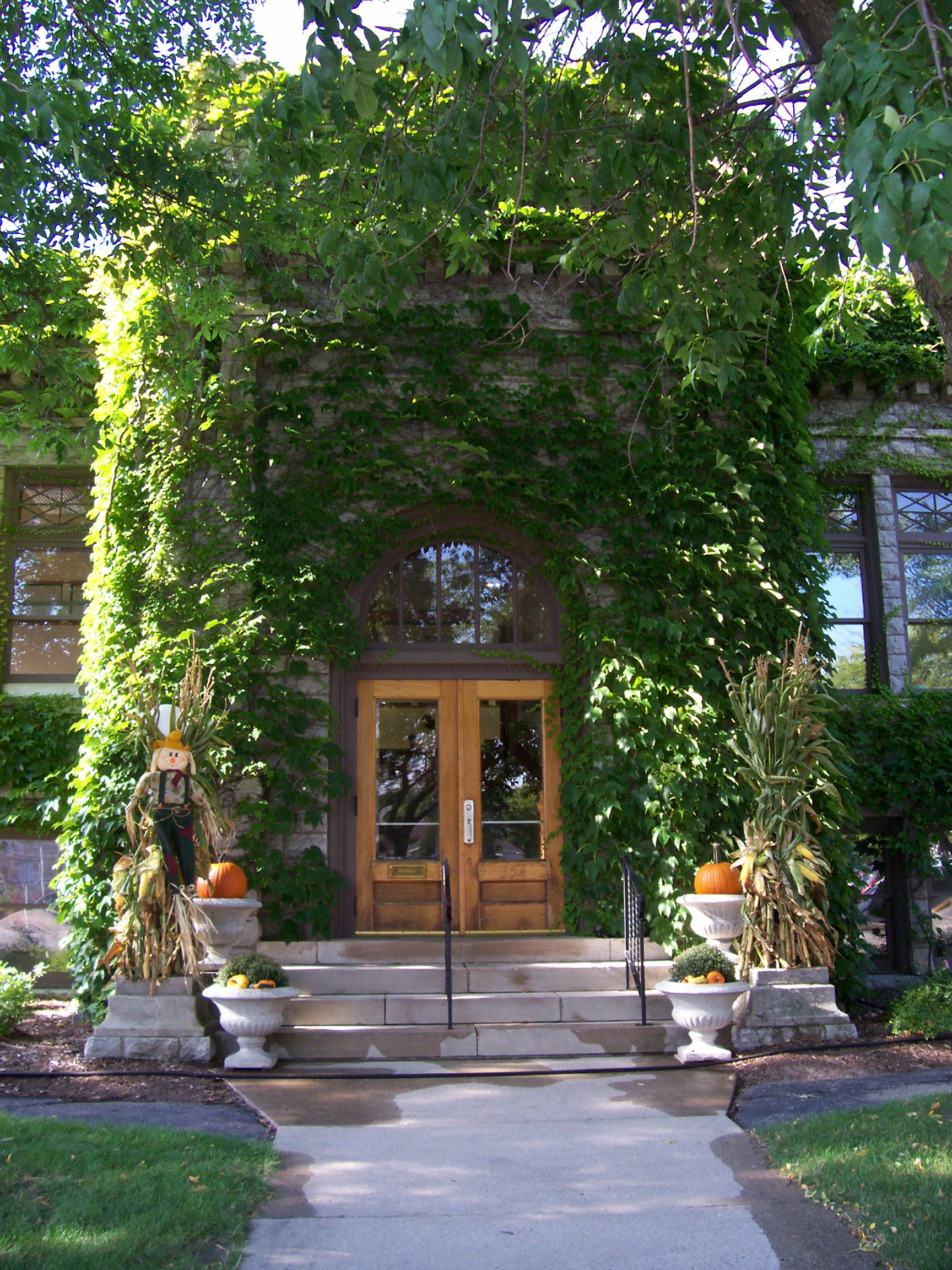
Former Carnegie Free Library

The community has one movie theater, Sturgeon Bay Cinema 6, and a professional regional theatre, the Third Avenue Playhouse. Every year the town hosts Steel Bridge Songfest, where nationally known musicians and songwriters perform. Past performers include Jackson Browne, Jane Wiedlin of The Go-Go's and Pat MacDonald of Timbuk3.

The city owns 20 parks totaling 121.7 acres (49.3 ha), with Sunset Park as the largest at 44 acres (18 ha). The county owns 56 acres (23 ha) of fairgrounds (John Miles County Park) and maintains 2.5 miles (4.0 km) of the Ahnapee Trail extending into the city limits. The Ice Age Trail diverges from the Ahnapee trail and passes through city limits for 5 miles (8.0 km) (mostly through city streets). It exits the city to reach its northern terminus at Potawatomi State Park. The Wisconsin DNR owns or maintains easements on two public properties in the city; 20 acres along Big Creek and 80 acres south of Strawberry Lane. Additionally, four private organizations maintain a total of 723.1 acres (292.6 ha) of parks and other areas preserved for natural and historical purposes within and adjacent to the city.

== Education ==
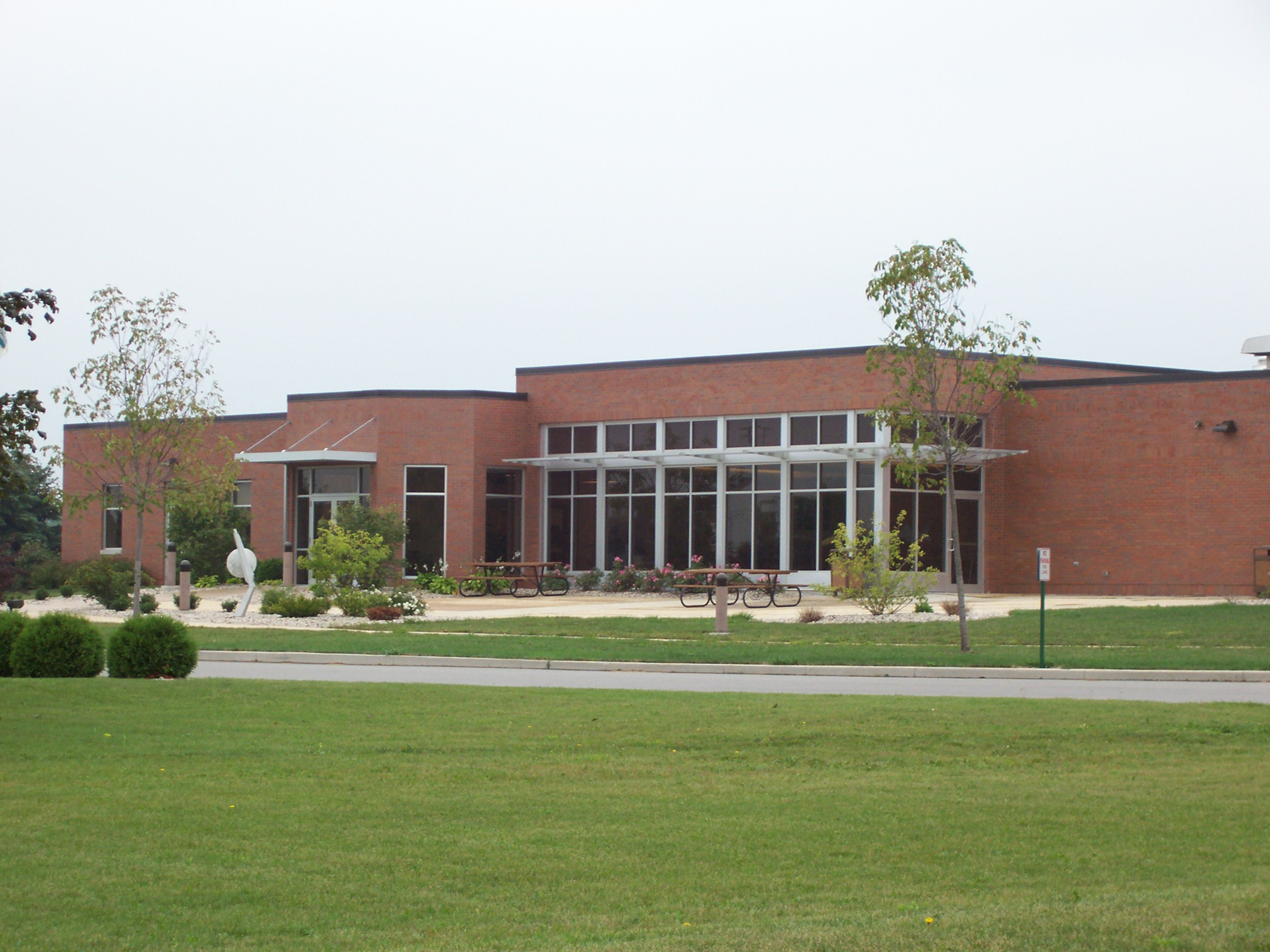
Sturgeon Bay Northeast Wisconsin Technical College campus

The community is served by Sturgeon Bay High School and has a satellite campus of Northeast Wisconsin Technical College. Sturgeon Bay has two elementary schools, Sawyer and Sunrise. The middle school, T.J. Walker Middle School, is connected to the high school. The team of the Sturgeon Bay Schools is the Clippers, named after the type of boat. St. Peter's Lutheran School is a pre-K to 8th grade school of the Wisconsin Evangelical Lutheran Synod. Three former schools, Saint Peter and Paul, Corpus Christi and Saint Joseph, have combined to form Saint John Bosco.

== Media ==
Sturgeon Bay had the Door County Advocate (now a subsidiary of Green Bay Press-Gazette) and numerous radio stations in the Door County Radio Market. No television stations originate from Sturgeon Bay and WFRV's and WLUK's remote-operated weather cameras are the only full-time presence of Green Bay stations in the city.

== Transportation ==
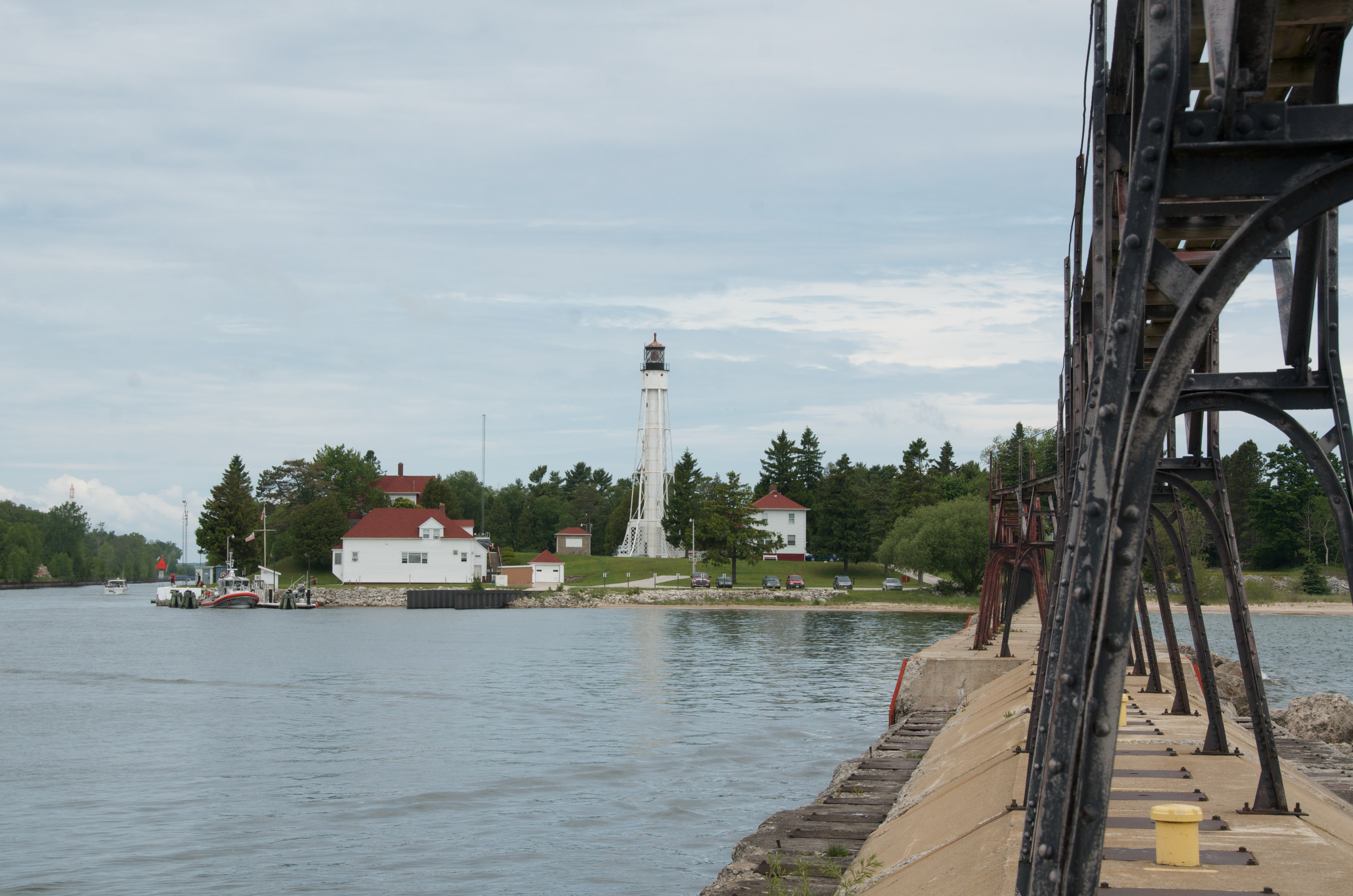
The Sturgeon Bay Canal Lighthouse along the Sturgeon Bay Ship Canal

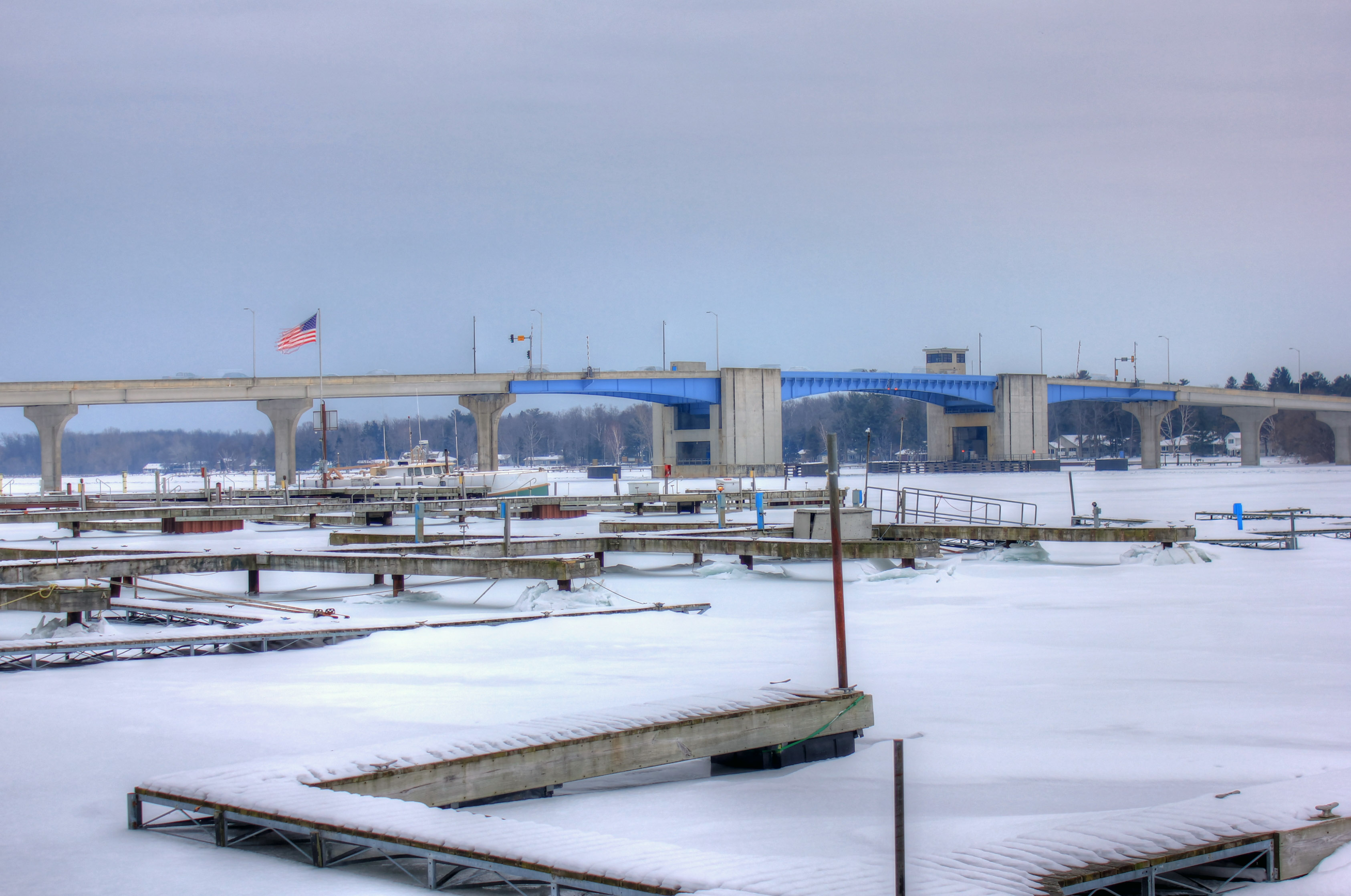
Bay View Bridge

=== Highways ===
- WIS 42 northbound travels to Egg Harbor, Fish Creek, Sister Bay, Ellison Bay and Gills Rock. South it travels to Algoma, Kewaunee, Two Rivers, and Manitowoc, where it connects to I-43.
- WIS 57 southbound connects to Green Bay and connects with Baileys Harbor and Jacksonport northbound before ending at WIS 42 in Sister Bay.
- CTH-B (Bay Shore Dr) runs north from downtown Sturgeon Bay along the bays of Green and Sturgeon Bays before ending near Egg Harbor.
- CTH-C travels north from WIS 42/57 as Duluth Avenue, then turns west at Elm Street for Little Sturgeon and Brussels.
- CTH-S continues south at the intersection with WIS 42/57 and CTH-C to provide a more direct alignment with Algoma.
- CTH-T begins on the east side of the city and heads northeast along the Lake Michigan shoreline to Valmy. Along the way, it becomes a Rustic Road known as R9
- CTH-U (Clay Banks Rd) comes into the city from the south after running along the Lake Michigan shoreline to end at WIS 42/57.
- CTH-BB (Gordon Rd) is a short highway on the far north side of the city connecting CTH-B with WIS 42/57.
- CTH-PD (Park Dr) is another short highway, connecting WIS 42/57 with Potawatomi State Park
- CTH-TT connects the southeastern part of the city with the Coast Guard Station before turning north as a Rustic Road 77 (R77) and then west as a regular county highway to end at WIS 42/57.

Bridges in the city include the Michigan Street Bridge (built 1929–1931), Bay View Bridge (built 1976–1978) and Oregon Street Bridge (built 2006–2008).

=== Water ===
Sturgeon Bay has a medium-sized port, and has received vessels as long as 1000 feet and a deadweight tonnage carrying capacity of 64,457 metric tonnes. A major shipbuilding and repair facility and the Coast Guard Station Sturgeon Bay is located at the port. Most traffic comes from pleasure boats. The dock at Graham Park is able to accommodate cruise boats.

=== Airport ===
Sturgeon Bay is served by Door County Cherryland Airport (IATA: SUE, ICAO: KSUE), which is off of Wisconsin Highway 42 and 57 on County Highway PD.

== Notable people ==
- Gideon Winans Allen, Wisconsin state representative
- Robert C. Bassett, U.S. presidential advisor
- Eddie Cochems (1877–1953), "father of the forward pass"
- Frank N. Graass, Wisconsin state representative
- Chris Greisen, Milwaukee Iron quarterback (AFL)
- Nick Greisen, Denver Broncos linebacker (NFL)
- Stuart Hagmann, film and television director
- Bernard Hahn, Wisconsin state representative
- Arthur G. Hansen (1925–2010), engineer, former president of Georgia Institute of Technology (1969–1971) and Purdue University (1971–1982), and chancellor of the Texas A&M University System (1982–1985)
- Joseph Harris, Wisconsin state senator
- Lawrence Johnson, Wisconsin state representative
- Al C. Kalmbach, founder of Kalmbach Publishing
- Doug Larson, newspaper columnist and writer
- Pat MacDonald, former member of Timbuk 3
- Edward S. Minor, U.S. representative
- Conrad P. Olson, Oregon Supreme Court justice
- Henry J. Overbeck, Wisconsin state representative
- Casey Rabach, Washington Redskins center (NFL)
- Dennis A. Reed, Wisconsin state representative
- Marian E. Rottman (1882–1955), nursing educator and supervisor
- Hallie H. Rowe, Wisconsin state representative
- Marjorie Rusche, composer
- Paul J. Schlise, U.S. Navy admiral
- Anna Augusta Von Helmholtz-Phelan, professor, author
- Alexander B. Whitman, Wisconsin state senator
- Jarvis T. Wright, Wisconsin state representative
- Randy Wright, Green Bay Packers quarterback (NFL)
