= Barbara Kooyman =

American singer-songwriter (born 1958)

Barbara K.
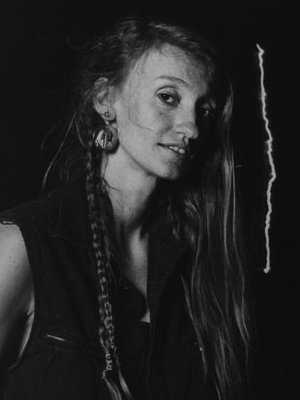
- Kooyman in 1986

Background information
- Genres: Folk rock, Americana, folk, alternative country
- Occupations: Musician, singer, songwriter
- Instruments: Vocals, guitar, mandolin, violin
- Years active: 1984–present
- Website: barbarakmusic.com

Barbara Kooyman (also known as by her stage name Barbara K and formerly Barbara K. MacDonald) (born October 4, 1958, in Wausau, Wisconsin) is an American musician based in Austin, Texas. In the 1980s, she, her then-husband Pat MacDonald, and a drum machine formed the recording act Timbuk 3 whose 1986 signature song was "The Future's So Bright, I Gotta Wear Shades". The duo did road work with Bob Dylan, Sting, and Jackson Browne. They once appeared on Saturday Night Live and were nominated for a Grammy Award for Best New Artist in 1987.

After divorcing MacDonald in 1995, Kooyman remained in Austin, raising the couple's son, taking the name Barbara K, and pursuing a solo career. She became entrenched in the city's rich musical community and recorded three solo albums, two of which featured her original songs and one filled with her own interpretations of the songs of Timbuk3 (all three albums released on her own label Sparrows Wheel).

As an independent recording artist, Kooyman saw a need in the music industry for strengthening alliances between artists and media outlets. She and co-founders Wolfgang Pracht and Ben Bright conceived and founded Artists For Media Diversity (A4MD). The 501(c)(3) charitable organization was formed to protect freedom of speech through the funding of services for alternative non-commercial media sources, to foster independent media voices, and to promote musical and cultural diversity.

One of the projects the organization has underway for empowering independent artists and community radio stations is a live music archive that artists and stations can contribute live performance tracks and from which other stations can access recordings for their own broadcast purposes.

Kooyman's work, both musical and organizational, is rooted in social activism and responsibility. After the Deepwater Horizon oil spill in 2010, Barbara K and Wolfgang Pracht wrote a reflection on the ominous environmental implications of such a disaster: "Swimming In Blackwater." The video features Kooyman and her frequent musical collaborator Richard Bowden.

== Discography ==
=== Albums ===
- Ready (2000)
- Undercover, the Songs of Timbuk3 (2005)
- Ghosts and Sparrows, Relative Truth (2005)
- Behind the Blue (2014)

=== Compilations ===
- Crossing the Red Line

=== Timbuk3 albums ===
- Greetings from Timbuk3 (1986), Billboard Hot 100 No. 50, UK Album Charts No. 51
- Eden Alley (1988)
- Edge of Allegiance (1989)
- Big Shot in the Dark (1991)
- Some of the Best of Timbuk3: Field Guide (1992)
- Espace Ornano (1993), their only live album, recorded at Espace Ornano, Paris, November 1991
- Looks Like Dark to Me (1994), 6-track EP
- A Hundred Lovers (1995)
