= Greetings from Timbuk3 =

Studio album by Timbuk 3
- Released: October 1986
- Studios: Dustbowl Studios (Hollywood, California) *except "Hairstyles and Attitudes" at Lone Star Studios (Austin, Texas)
- Genre: Rock
- Length: 36:05
- Label: I.R.S.
- Producer: Dennis Herring

Timbuk 3 chronology
Greetings from Timbuk3 (1986)	Eden Alley (1988)

Singles from Greetings from Timbuk3
- 1. "The Future's So Bright, I Gotta Wear Shades" Released: September 1986; 2. "Hairstyles and Attitudes" Released: 1986; 3. "Life Is Hard" Released: 1987

Professional ratings
Review scores
Source	Rating
AllMusic	4.5/5 stars
Robert Christgau	A−
The Encyclopedia of Popular Music	4/5 stars
MusicHound Rock: The Essential Album Guide	3.5/5 stars

Greetings from Timbuk3 is the debut album by American band Timbuk 3, released in 1986. The album contains their only charting single, "The Future's So Bright, I Gotta Wear Shades", which reached number 19 on the US Billboard Hot 100.

The songs "Life Is Hard" and "Shame on You" were used in the 1986 film The Texas Chainsaw Massacre 2 and were included on the film's accompanying soundtrack album.

== Critical reception ==
Trouser Press called Greetings from Timbuk3 "surely one of the darkest albums ever to have yielded a hit single."

== Track listing ==
All songs written by Pat MacDonald, except where noted. Copyright Mamdadaddi Music/I.R.S. Music, Inc. admin. by Atlantic Music. (All Songs BMI).

1. "The Future's So Bright, I Gotta Wear Shades" – 3:21
2. "Life Is Hard" – 4:08
3. "Hairstyles and Attitudes" – 2:51
4. "Facts About Cats" – 3:16
5. "I Need You" – 3:50
6. "Just Another Movie" – 4:16
7. "Friction" – 3:44
8. "Cheap Black & White" – 2:54
9. "Shame On You" – 5:04 (Barbara K. MacDonald, Pat MacDonald)
10. "I Love You in the Strangest Way" – 2:41

== Personnel ==
Musicians

- Barbara K. MacDonald – co-lead vocals on tracks 1, 5, 10, lead vocals on tracks 4, 9, backing vocals, keyboards, synthesizers, electric, 12-string and acoustic guitars, bass, drums, percussion, harmonica, violin, mandolin
- Pat MacDonald – co-lead vocals on tracks 1, 5, 10, lead vocals on tracks 2, 3, 6, 7, 8, backing vocals, keyboards, synthesizers, electric, 12-string and acoustic guitars, bass, drums, percussion, harmonica, violin, mandolin

Production

- Produced by Dennis Herring
- Engineers: Dennis Herring and Mark Teston

== Charts ==
Chart performance for Greetings from Timbuk3
Chart (1986)	Peak position
Australian Albums (Kent Music Report)	86
UK Albums Chart	51
US Billboard 200	50
