= Big Shot in the Dark =

Studio album by Timbuk 3
- Released: 1991
- Studio: The Doghouse (Austin)
- Genre: Roots rock
- Label: I.R.S.
- Producer: Pat and Barbara K. MacDonald

Timbuk 3 chronology
Edge of Allegiance (1989)	Big Shot in the Dark (1991)	Espace Ornano (1993)

Big Shot in the Dark is the fourth album by the American band Timbuk 3, released in 1991. "Mudflap Girl" was released as a single.

== Production ==
Big Shot in the Dark was Timbuk 3's first album as a four-piece band. Courtney Audain played bass and steel drums, and Wally Ingram served as the drummer/percussionist. "The Border Crossing" was inspired by the fall of the Berlin Wall. Evan Johns played guitar on "Mudflap Girl".

== Critical reception ==
Professional ratings
Review scores
Source	Rating
AllMusic	3/5 stars
Calgary Herald	B

The Chicago Tribune called Timbuk 3 "a distinctly American band both in its spare, rootsy rock sound and its thematic obsession with the American dream gone awry." The Calgary Herald deemed the album "Timbuk 3 at its twangy, idiosyncratic best."

Kenneth Bays of AllMusic wrote: "On their fourth album, Timbuk 3 officially became a foursome ... there's a newfound sense of instrumental adventurousness all around. (''49 Plymouth' employs a lute, while an instrumental version of 'Sunshine' is played on steel drums)... Big Shot in the Dark has a bluesy, droning quality throughout, a vibe that would be amplified further on Timbuk 3's 1994 EP Looks Like Dark to Me."

== Track listing ==
- All songs written by Pat MacDonald, except where noted.
1. God Made an Angel
2. Sunshine
3. Two Medicines (Pat and Barbara K. MacDonald)
4. The Border Crossing (Pat and Barbara K. MacDonald)
5. Big Shot in the Dark
6. Mudflap Girl
7. Dis•••land (Was Made for You & Me)
8. Wake Up Little Darlin'
9. '49 Plymouth
10. The Little Things
11. Sunshine (Instrumental)

== Personnel ==
Timbuk 3

- Pat MacDonald: Vocals, Electric and Acoustic Guitars, Harmonica, Lute, Sampler
- Barbara K. MacDonald: Vocals, Electric Guitars, Violin, Percussion, Keyboards and Programming
- Courtney Audain: Bass, Keyboards, Steel Drums, Various Other Percussion
- Wally Ingram: Drums, Percussion, Handclaps

Additional Personnel

- Liz Harrah: Organ on track 1
- Evan Johns: Lead and Slide Guitar on track 6
- Gary Moon: Hand claps
- John Treanor: Washboard on tracks 3, 4, and 9

Production

- Arranged and produced by Pat and Barbara K. MacDonald
- Recording by Gary Moon; technical assistance by David Roach
- Mixed by David Tickle (The Bunker, Malibu)
- Mastered by Alan Yoshida at The Mastering Lab
