= Eden Alley =

Studio album by Timbuk 3
- Released: 1988
- Recorded: Dustbowl, The Fire Station
- Genre: Rock
- Length: 38:29
- Label: I.R.S.
- Producer: Dennis Herring

Timbuk 3 chronology
Greetings from Timbuk3 (1986)	Eden Alley (1988)	Edge of Allegiance (1989)

Eden Alley is the second album by American band Timbuk 3, released in 1988 on I.R.S. Records.

The album charted at number 107 on the Billboard 200 and included the single "Rev. Jack and His Roamin' Cadillac Church", which peaked at number 34 on Billboard's Mainstream Rock chart. Kenneth Bays of AllMusic compared the album to Beck's career, stating the album had similar elements. Bays also stated the album included "the same brand of irony-fueled lyrics and smart songcraft" as their debut album Greetings from Timbuk3, with Spin calling it an equally good followup.

== Track listing ==
1. "Tarzan Was a Bluesman" – 1:26
2. "Easy" – 4:26
3. "Reckless Driver" – 5:44
4. "Dance Fever" – 2:42
5. "Sample the Dog" – 3:18
6. "Too Much Sex, Not Enough Affection" – 3:15
7. "Welcome to the Human Race" – 3:17
8. "Eden Alley" – 3:29
9. "Rev. Jack & His Roamin' Cadillac Church" – 4:13
10. "A Sinful Life" – 3:36
11. "Little People Make Big Mistakes" – 2:07
12. "Reprise (Don't Stop Now)" – 0:55
