= The Future's So Bright, I Gotta Wear Shades =

1986 single by Timbuk 3

- 7-inch U.S. single

Single by Timbuk 3

from the album Greetings from Timbuk3
- B-side: "I'll Do All Right"
- Released: September 1986
- Genre: Folk rock, new wave
- Length: 3:21
- Label: I.R.S.
- Songwriter: Pat MacDonald
- Producer: Dennis Herring

Timbuk 3 singles chronology
"The Future's So Bright, I Gotta Wear Shades" (1986)	"Hairstyles and Attitudes" (1986)

Music video
- "The Future's So Bright, I Gotta Wear Shades" on YouTube

"The Future's So Bright, I Gotta Wear Shades" is a song by Timbuk 3. It is the opening track from their debut album, Greetings from Timbuk3. Released as the album's first single in 1986, it was the band's only significant mainstream hit.

== Background ==
The inspiration for the song, and the title specifically, came when Barbara MacDonald said to her husband singer/songwriter Pat MacDonald, "The future is looking so bright, we'll have to wear sunglasses!" But, while Barbara had made the comment in earnest – it was the early '80s, the two had met and married and were starting a family, their first EP was coming, their book was filling up with gigs – Pat heard the comment as an ironic quip and wrote down instead, "The future's so bright, I gotta wear shades."

From there, the lyrics to the song were born, but not the song as it ended up in the minds of popular culture. While Pat wrote a song of a young nuclear scientist and his rich future, listening audiences heard a graduation theme song.

Pat revealed on VH1's 100 Greatest One-Hit Wonders of the 80s that the meaning of the song was widely misinterpreted as a positive perspective in regard to the near future. Pat somewhat clarified the meaning by stating that it was, contrary to popular belief, a "grim" outlook. While not saying so directly, he hinted at the idea that the bright future was in fact due to impending nuclear holocaust. The "job waiting" after graduation signified the demand for nuclear scientists to facilitate such events. Pat drew upon the multitude of past predictions which transcend several cultures that foreshadow the world ending in the 1980s, along with the nuclear tension at the height of the Cold War to compile the song.

Two verses were written more explicitly portraying the ironic intent of the song. One went:

Well I'm well aware of the world out there,
getting blown all to pieces, but what do I care?

The other referred to a supporter of Ronald Reagan as "a flaming fascist". However, they were omitted from the final recording because MacDonald felt they were too heavy-handed and obvious.

== Chart performance ==
The song was the group's only major hit, reaching No. 19 on the Billboard Hot 100 and No. 14 on the Billboard Album Rock Tracks chart. Additionally, the song reached No. 21 on the UK Singles Chart.

Chart (1986–1987)	Peak position
Australia (Kent Music Report)	18
Canada Adult Contemporary (RPM)	23
Canada Top Singles (RPM)	15
Ireland (IRMA)	11
New Zealand (Recorded Music NZ)	29
UK Singles (Official Charts)	21
US Billboard Album Rock Tracks	14
US Billboard Hot 100	19
US Cash Box	21

== Rejection of commercial licensing ==
The former members of Timbuk 3 have refused to license the song for commercials, including a $900,000 offer from AT&T and offers from Ford, the U.S. Army, and Bausch & Lomb for their Ray-Ban sunglasses.
