= Kate Vargas =

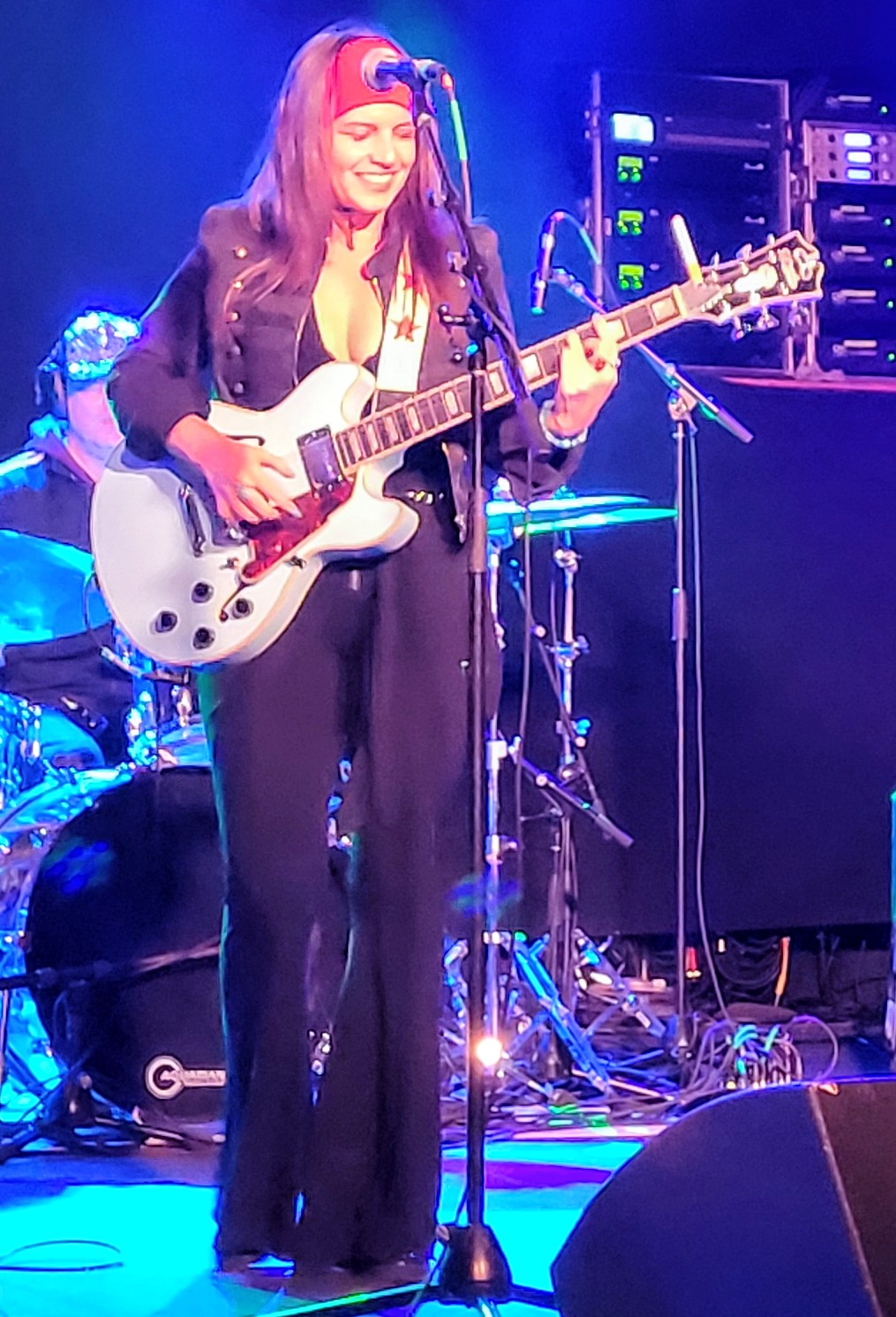
- Sgt. Splendor at Cervantes' Other Side in Denver, Colorado, United States

Background information
- Born: December 3, 1986 (age 39); Albuquerque, New Mexico, United States
- Genres: Junkyard folk; blues; rock; americana
- Occupations: Musician; songwriter
- Instruments: Flute; guitar

Kate Vargas is a singer and songwriter whose lyrical themes extend from folk to supernatural. Her gravely voice, reminiscent of Tom Waits, has reached audiences across the United States as well as at the Ireland’s Westport Folk and Bluegrass Festival

She has released a number of solo albums including For The Wolfish & Wandering and Rumpumpo.

She was born in Albuquerque, New Mexico, United States, and is based in New York. In 2025, she was working on a project called Sgt. Splendor with Eric McFadden. Their first album Occasions for Self Congratulations was released in 2022.

== Discography ==
- Down to My Soul (2013)
- Strangeclaw (2016)
- For the Wolfish & Wandering (2019)
- Rumpumpo (2021)
