= Eric McFadden =

American guitarist, vocalist, and songwriter (born 1965)

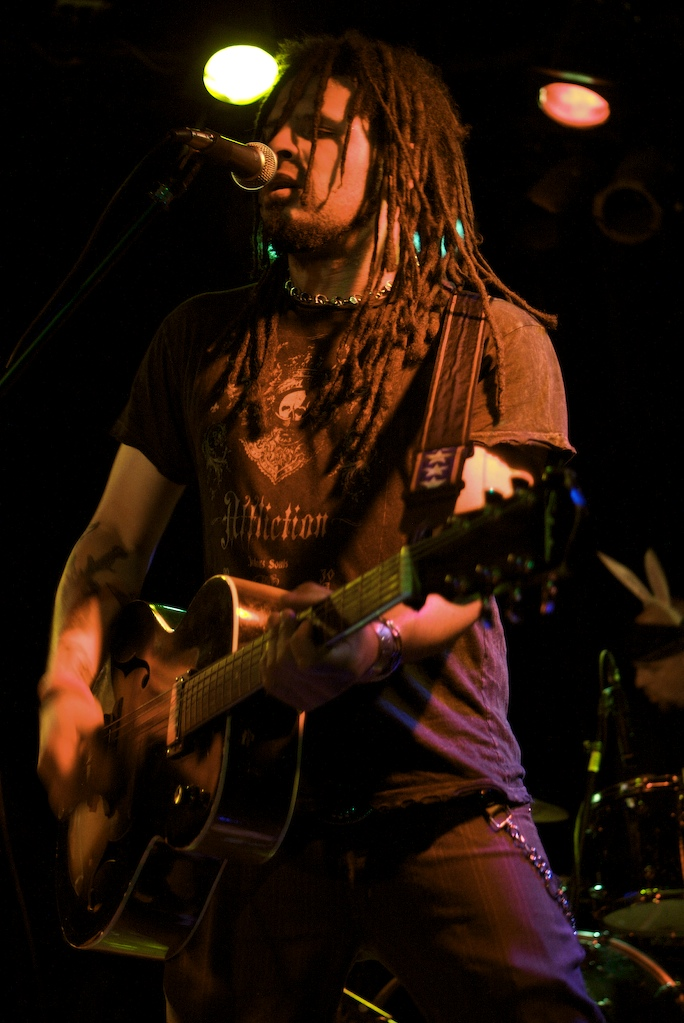
- McFadden at the Viper Room in Los Angeles, California, 2007

Background information
- Born: Eric Byron McFadden; December 1, 1965 (age 60); New York City, New York, U.S.
- Genres: Blues rock; alternative rock; funk
- Occupation: Musician
- Instruments: Guitar, mandolin, vocals
- Website: www.ericmcfadden.com

Eric McFadden (born December 1, 1965) is an American guitarist, vocalist, and songwriter from San Francisco.

He spent his formative years in Albuquerque, New Mexico, receiving lessons from Stanton Hirsch. During his mid-teens, he moved to Syracuse, New York, where he studied jazz guitar. He spent time in Spain studying flamenco and in interviews has expressed interest in Gypsy music.

McFadden played in a number of bands in Albuquerque, most notably the Angry Babies, a three-piece alternative rock band that toured along the West coast and released three albums in limited runs. After moving to San Francisco, he gained notoriety as lead singer and guitarist for the band Liar, which originated in 1994. Liar's debut album Devil Dog Road and follow-up album Gone Too Far received acclaim with both fans and critics. Liar won the SF Weekly Music Award (Wammie) in 1997 and BAM magazine's California Music Awards in 1998. Paulo Baldi, who was the drummer for Liar, also joined McFadden in the band Alien Lovestock, which was self-described as "chili-powered, hard rockin', avant-funk, Latin, surreal-desert groove."

McFadden toured extensively between 2002-2010 with his trio, EMT, which features bassist, James Whiton and a revolving cast of drummers such as Jeff Cohen, Paulo Baldi, and Kevin Carnes.

Other credits include three years as guitarist and mandolinist for George Clinton and the P-Funk All-Stars. In 2004, McFadden joined Stockholm Syndrome with Widespread Panic bassist Dave Schools, singer-guitarist Jerry Joseph and drummer Wally Ingram. In 2005–2007, with Wally Ingram he joined Eric Burdon and the Animals and toured Europe, Canada, the U.S., and Australia. In January 2013, he was again on tour with Eric Burdon through the summer of 2014. Since 2015, McFadden has been primary guitarist for New Orlean's artist, Anders Osborne. McFadden is also touring and recording with his new supergroup, T.E.N. (Thomas Pridgen, Eric McFadden, Norwood Fisher), and Tasty Face (with Fishbone frontman, Angelo Moore).

McFadden has worked with Les Claypool, Joe Strummer, The Reverend Horton Heat, The Coup, Galactic, Keb' Mo, Bernie Worrell, Pat MacDonald, Fishbone, Widespread Panic, Jackson Browne, Nels Cline, and Mike Watt, among many others.

He has released several albums through the French label Bad Reputation, including Dementia and Pull a Rabbit Out Of His Hat, Tribute Vol 2 on which McFadden pays homage to his favorite artists. In 2009, he released Delicate Thing and Train to Salvation, also on Bad Reputation and on Terminus in the U.S. His album, Bluebird on Fire, was released in 2011 by both Bad Reputation in Europe. This release features Norwood Fisher, Dave Catching, Dave Schools, Paulo Baldi, Victor DeLorenzo, Abby Travis, and Wally Ingram. McFadden's Faraway Brothers album, Hand Me That Cow, was released in 2012. Eric Released the acoustic album, "The Light Ahead" in 2015. In 2018, McFadden also collaborated with Omar Torrez with the album entitled, Cholula Sessions. In 2018, McFadden signed to Tab Benoit's label, Whiskey Bayou records who released "Pain By Numbers" which features Doug Wimbish (Living Colour), Terence Higgins (Ani DiFranco, Warren Haynes) and Tab Benoit. McFadden has been recently working with Junkyard Folk singer/songwriter, Kate Vargas, and will be featured on her upcoming release, "Rum Pum Po". McFadden and Vargas have been doing a Facebook livestream on Mondays called "Live From The Red Couch".

== Selected discography ==
- Who's Laughing Now? (1996)
- Eric McFadden (2000)
- Devil Moon (2003)
- Diamonds to Coal (2003)
- Alektorophobia (with Wally Ingram, 2005)
- Joy of Suffering (2005)
- Dementia (compilation, 2006)
- Let's Die Forever... Together (2007)
- Delicate Thing (2008)
- Train to Salvation (2009)
- Pull A Rabbit Out Of His Hat - Tribute Vol. 2 (2010)
- Bluebird of Fire (2011)
- Inside Out (2012)
- The Light Ahead (2015)
- Pain by Numbers (2018)
- Hail to Hell (Acoustic Tribute to Alice Cooper) (2021)
