= Timbuk 3 =

American rock band (1983–1995)

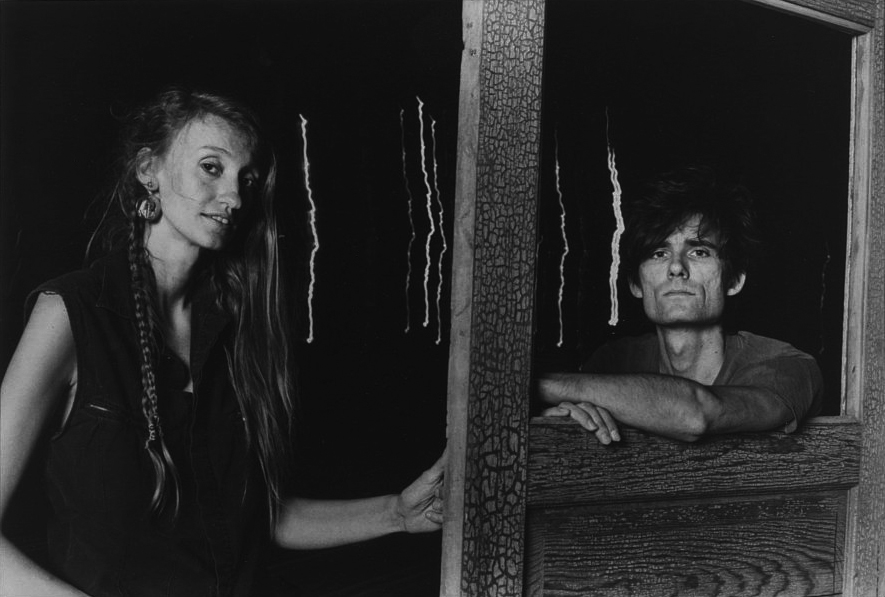
- Barbara and Pat MacDonald in 1986

Background information
- Origin: Madison, Wisconsin, U.S.
- Genres: Folk rock, alternative pop, new wave
- Years active: 1983–1995
- Labels: I.R.S. Watermelon; High Street
- Past members: Pat MacDonald; Barbara K. MacDonald; Courtney Audain; Wally Ingram

Timbuk 3, stylized TIMBUK3, was an American rock band that released six albums between 1986 and 1995. They are best known for their Top 20 single "The Future's So Bright, I Gotta Wear Shades".

== Career ==
Timbuk 3 was formed in 1984 in Madison, Wisconsin, by the husband-and-wife team of Pat MacDonald (guitars, bass, harmonica, vocals, drum programming) and Barbara Kooyman (guitars, mandolin, violin, rhythm programming, vocals). After moving to Austin, Texas, they signed to I.R.S. Records.

In 1991, Wally Ingram (drums) and Courtney Audain (bass) joined the duo.

Timbuk 3 briefly appeared in the 1988 movie D.O.A. (starring Dennis Quaid and Meg Ryan, directed by Rocky Morton and Annabel Jankel) as a house band. They performed the songs "Too Much Sex, Not Enough Affection" and "Life Is Hard".

== Discography ==
=== Studio albums ===
Year	Title	Label	US	AUS	UK
1986	Greetings from Timbuk3	I.R.S.	50	86	51
1988	Eden Alley	I.R.S.	107	-	-
1989	Edge of Allegiance	I.R.S.	-	-	-
1991	Big Shot in the Dark	I.R.S.	-	-	-
1993	Espace Ornano	Watermelon	-	-	-
1993	Looks Like Dark to Me EP	High Street	-	-	-
1995	A Hundred Lovers	High Street	-	-	-

=== Singles ===
Year	Title	US	US Main	AUS	IRE	NZ	UK
1986	"The Future's So Bright, I Gotta Wear Shades"	19	14	18	11	29	21
1986	"Hairstyles and Attitudes"	-	-	-	-	-	-
1987	"Life Is Hard"	-	35	-	-	-	-
1987	"All I Want for Christmas (Is World Peace)"	-	-	-	-	-	-
1988	"Rev. Jack & His Roamin' Cadillac Church"	-	34	-	-	-	-
1989	"National Holiday"	-	-	-	-	-	-
1995	"Just Wanna Funk with Your Mind"	-	-	99	-	-	-

== See also ==
- Grammy Award for Best New Artist
- List of 1980s one-hit wonders in the United States
