= Wally Ingram =

American drummer and musician

Wally Ingram is an American drummer and musician. He is most famous as a member of the band Timbuk 3.

In recent years, he has toured with the multi-instrumentalist David Lindley, and released several records with him:

- 2000 : Twango Bango Deluxe
- 2001 : Twango Bango II
- 2003 : Twango Bango III
- 2004 : Live in Europe

In 1999 he was a member of 'The Sensitive Ones' (A name coined by Bruce Springsteen) Tour.

After being diagnosed with cancer, Ingram played in a January 2007 benefit concert staged by Butch Vig and Bonnie Raitt on his behalf. Other participants included Sheryl Crow, Jackson Browne, Crowded House, and George Clinton.

As of February 2014, Ingram is the new drummer in German singer/songwriter Stefan Stoppok's band and working on their next album in Hamburg, Germany.

In 2018, Ingram played with Bob Weir and Phil Lesh as part of the pair's "Duo Tour".
