= Pat MacDonald (musician) =

American musician and songwriter (born 1952)

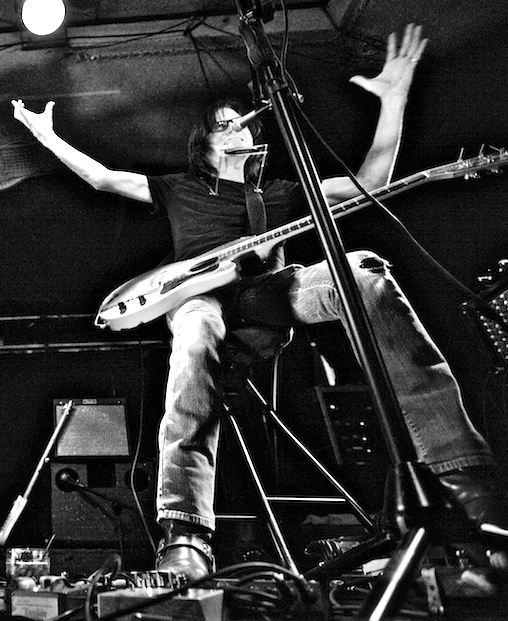
- MacDonald in 2009

Background information
- Born: August 6, 1952 (age 73); Green Bay, Wisconsin, U.S.
- Occupations: Singer, musician, songwriter
- Instruments: Vocals, guitar
- Years active: 1984–present
- Formerly of: Timbuk 3

Patrick Lee MacDonald (born August 6, 1952) is an American musician and songwriter. He was the singer, guitarist, and main songwriter for Timbuk 3, nominated for a Grammy Award for Best New Artist in 1987. He formed the duo with his wife, Barbara K. MacDonald, in Madison, Wisconsin, in 1984 before moving to Austin, Texas, that same year. Their breakup in 1995 spurred a solo career that has steadily produced releases in both Europe and the US.

== Career ==
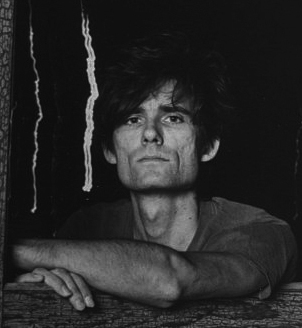
MacDonald in 1986

Songwriting credits include collaborations with Cher, Keith Urban, Imogen Heap, Stewart Copeland of The Police, Peter Frampton, and Japanese composer Ryuichi Sakamoto. Songs he has written, or co-written, have been recorded by Aerosmith, Oysterhead, Cher, Jools Holland, Billy Ray Cyrus, Night Ranger, Zucchero, and others, and have appeared in movies ranging from the controversial horror classic The Texas Chainsaw Massacre 2 (1986) with Dennis Hopper, to Tommy Boy (1995) starring Chris Farley.

MacDonald and his friend and collaborator Eric McFadden record and perform as the gothic-country duo The Legendary Sons of Crack Daniels. He performed and toured as Purgatory Hill with Milwaukee singer and songwriter Melaniejane.

In 2005, he co-founded Steel Bridge Songfest, an annual not-for-profit benefit concert and songwriting festival held in his current hometown of Sturgeon Bay, Wisconsin.

== Solo album discography ==
- Pat MacDonald Sleeps with His Guitar (Ark 21) (1997)
- Begging Her Graces (Ulftone) (1999)
- Degrees of Gone (Ulftone) (2001)
- Strange Love: PM Does DM (Ulftone) (2003)
- In the Red Room (DarkPresents) (2004)
- Troubadour of Stomp (Broken Halo) (2007)
- In the Red Room re-release (SB United) (2008)
- Purgatory Hill self-release (2009)
- The Ragged, Jagged Way Back Home self-released (2019)
- Strange Love: PM Does DM (Chronological Records) (2021)
- LOL (Light O' Love) self-release (2024)
