= Sturgeon Bay (disambiguation) =

Sturgeon Bay is a city in the U.S. state of Wisconsin.

Sturgeon Bay may also refer to the following:

== Communities ==
in the United States:

- Sturgeon Bay, Michigan, a community in Bliss Township
- Sturgeon Bay (town), Wisconsin, a town in Door County

in Canada:

- Sturgeon Bay, Ontario, a village in Tay

== Bodies of water ==
- Sturgeon Bay, a bay in Door County, Wisconsin
- Sturgeon Bay (Michigan), a bay in Emmet County, Michigan

== Transportation ==
- Sturgeon Bay Road, section of Wisconsin Highway 57 from Green Bay to Dyckesville, Wisconsin

== See also ==
- Sturgeon Bay Bridge, a historic bridge in Sturgeon Bay, Wisconsin
- Sturgeon Bay Canal Light, a lighthouse near Sturgeon Bay, Wisconsin
- Sturgeon Bay Canal North Pierhead Light, a lighthouse near Sturgeon Bay, Wisconsin
- Sturgeon Bay Post Office, the main post office in Sturgeon Bay, Wisconsin
- Sturgeon Bay Ship Canal, a shipping canal connecting Sturgeon Bay with Lake Michigan
