= Coast Guard Station Sturgeon Bay =

Coast Guard Station on Lake Michigan

- Part of 9th District
- Sturgeon Bay, Wisconsin
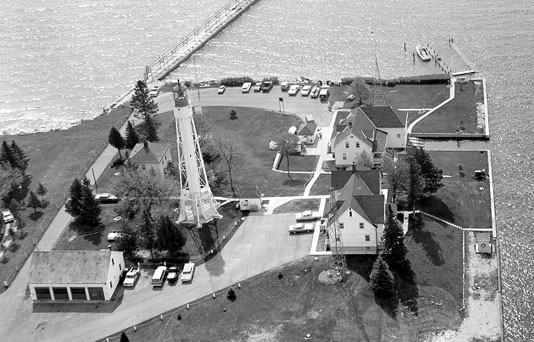
- Aerial view of Coast Guard Station Sturgeon Bay

Site information
- Type: Coast Guard Station
- Owner: United States Coast Guard (USCG)

Location
- Coordinates: 44°47′40″N 87°18′47″W

Site history
- Built: 1886
- In use: 1902 to Present

Coast Guard Station Sturgeon Bay is a United States Coast Guard station located on Lake Michigan and the Sturgeon Bay Ship Canal in the Town of Sturgeon Bay in Door County, Wisconsin, just outside the city of Sturgeon Bay. The Sturgeon Bay Canal Light is located within the limits of the station. Duties of the station include search and rescue, law enforcement and ice rescue missions during the winter months.

Station Sturgeon Bay is in District 9 and it is a sub-unit of Sector Lake Michigan.

== Gallery ==
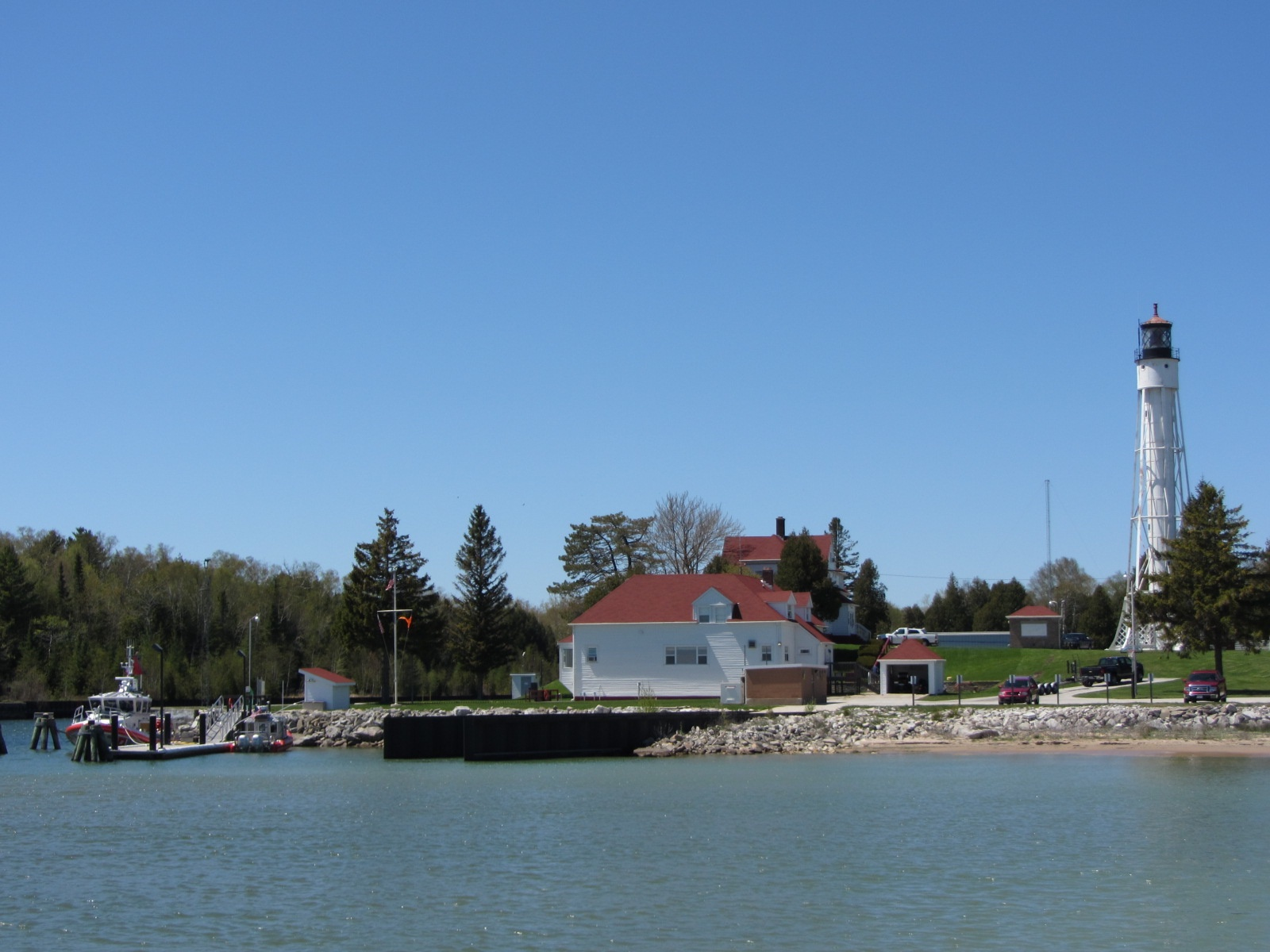
In May

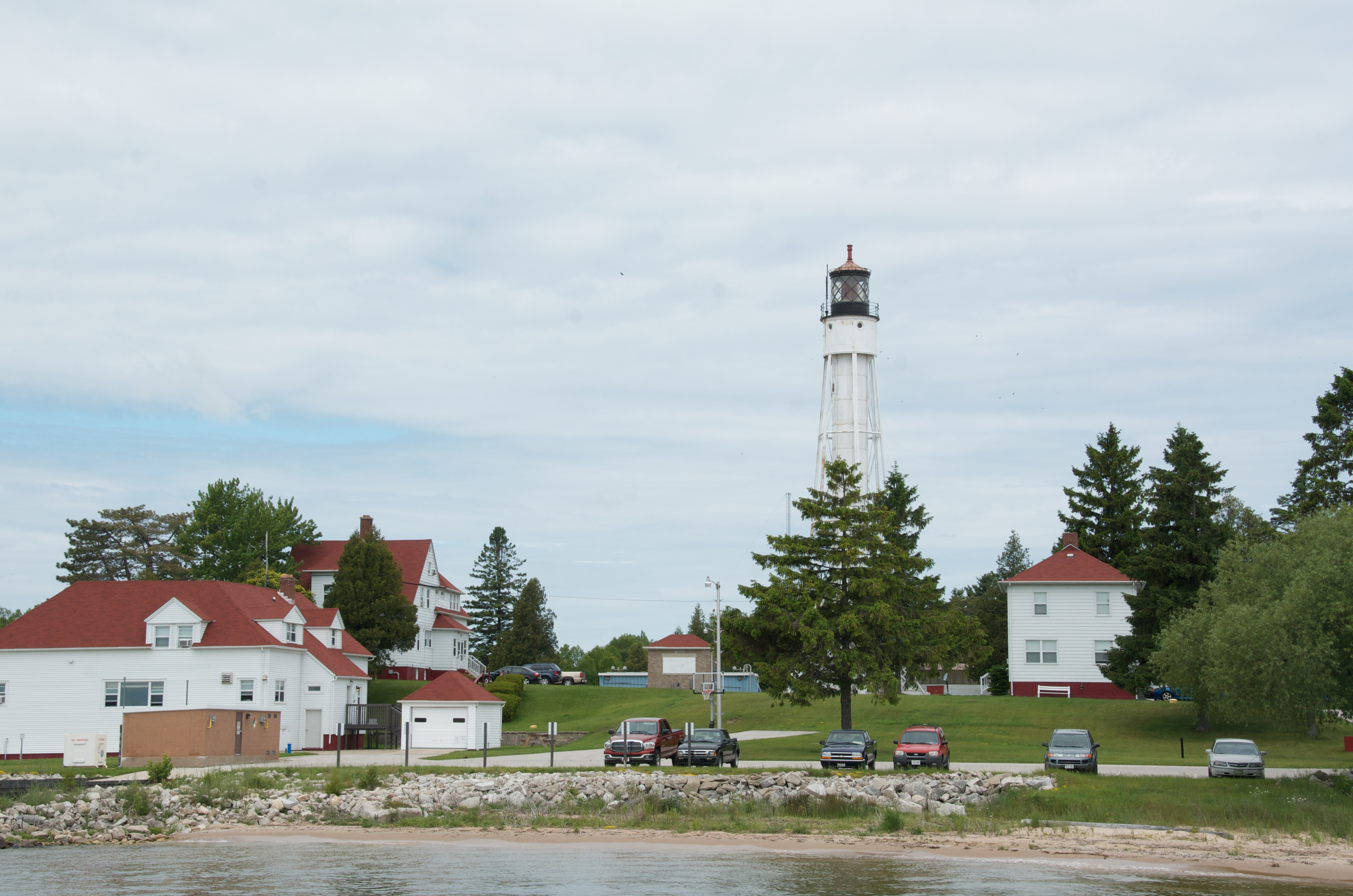
In June

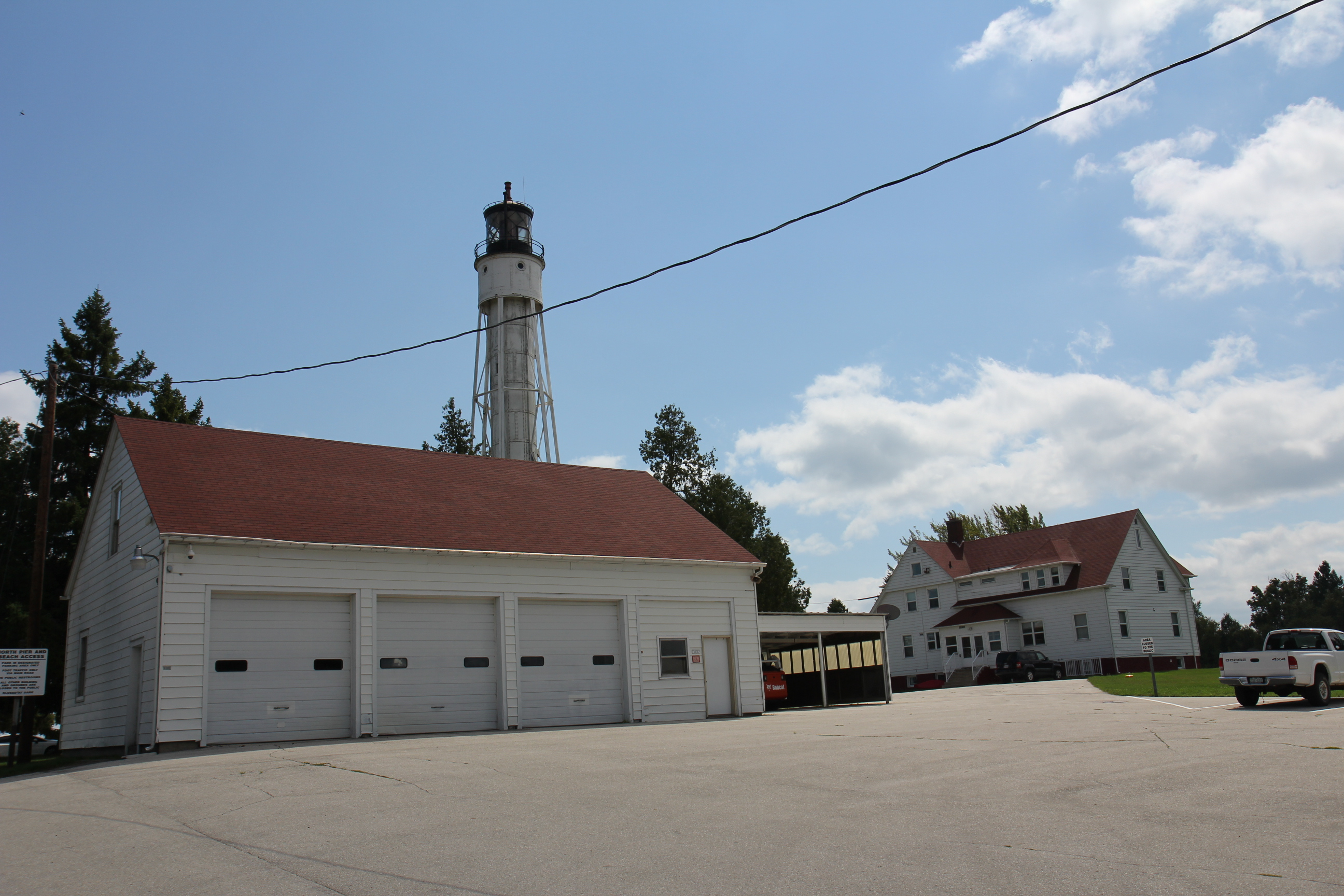
In August

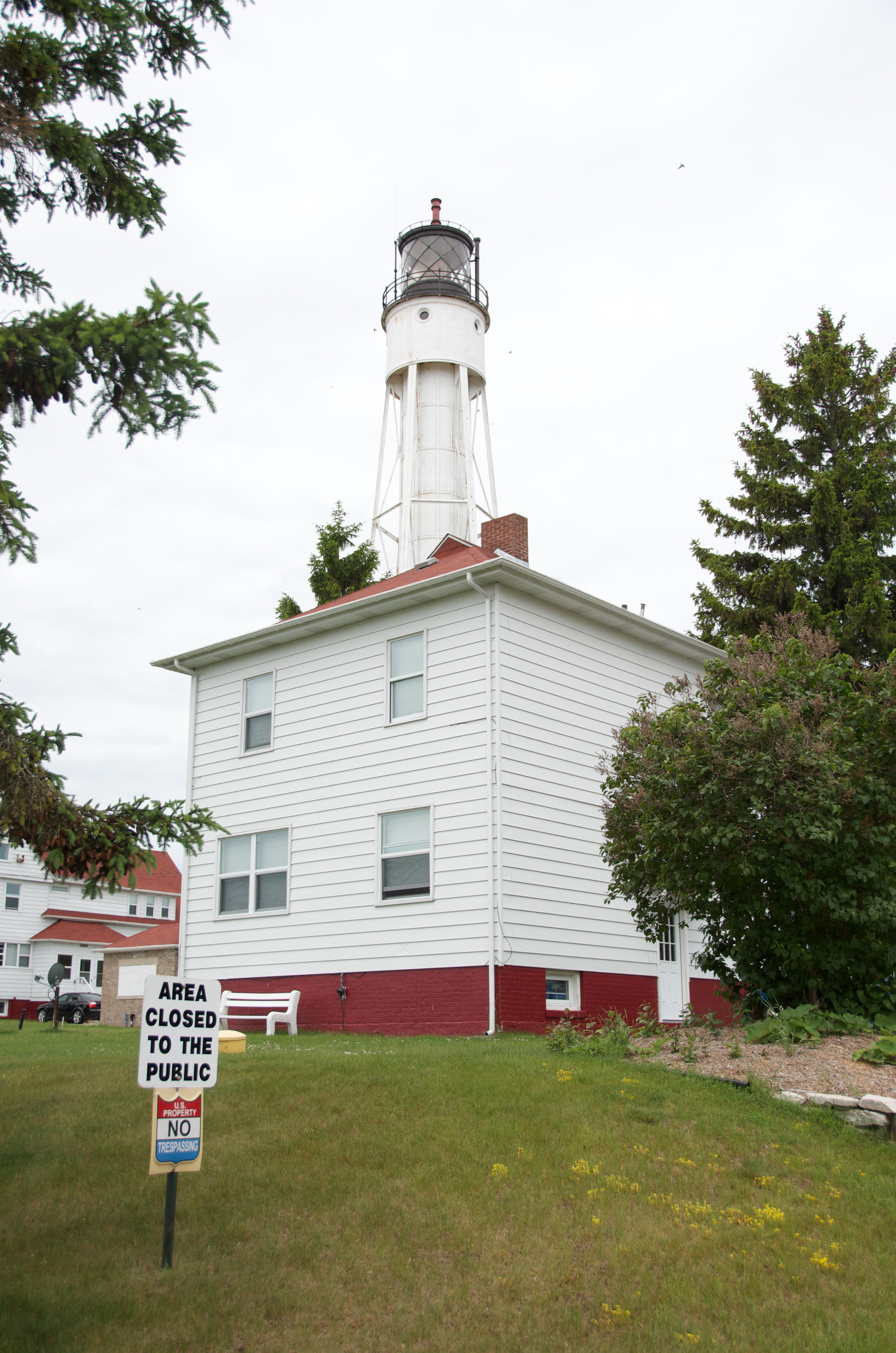
Closed to the public sign

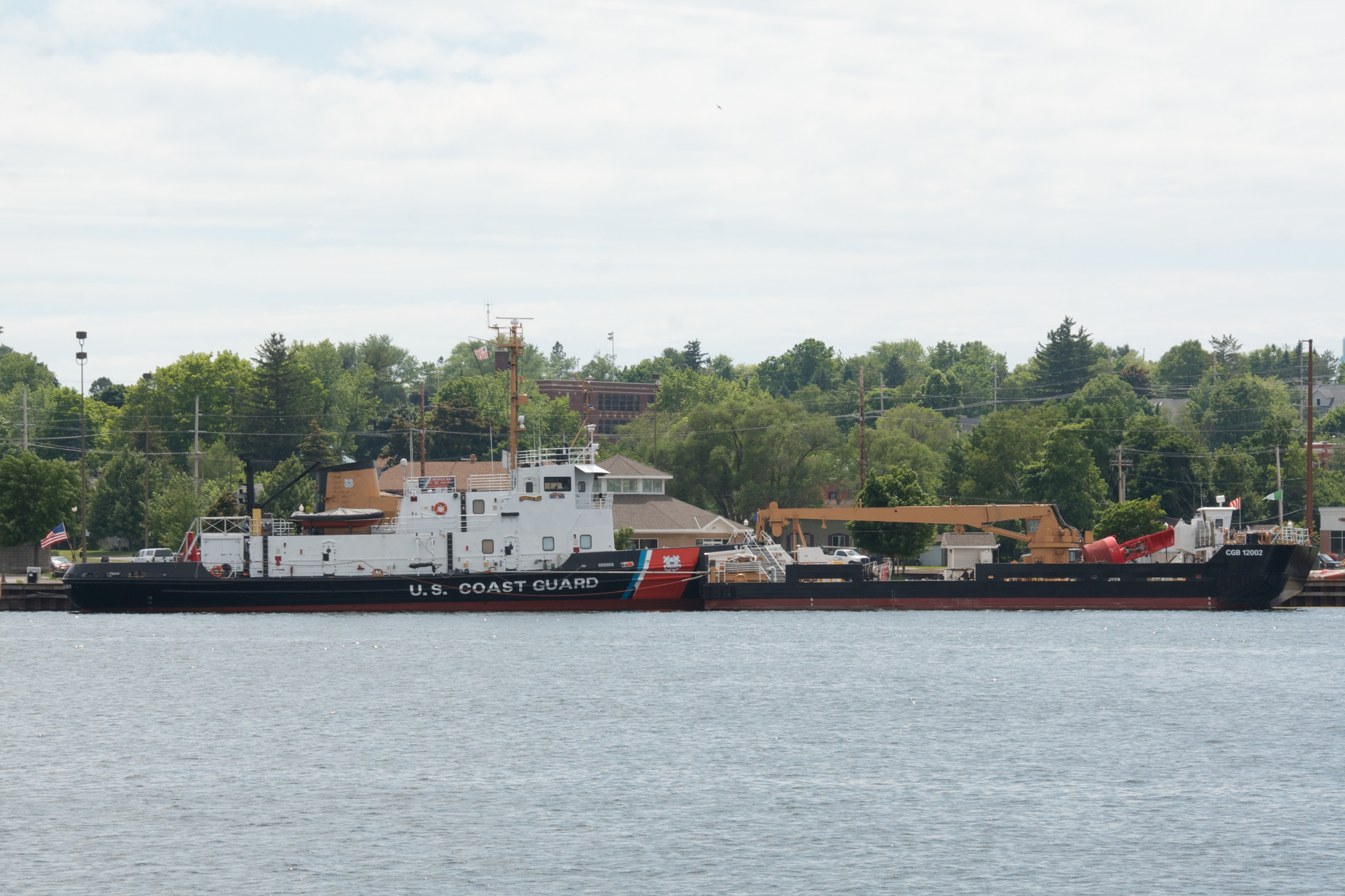
USCGC Mobile Bay, an icebreaking tug based out of Sturgeon Bay, with barge for servicing buoys

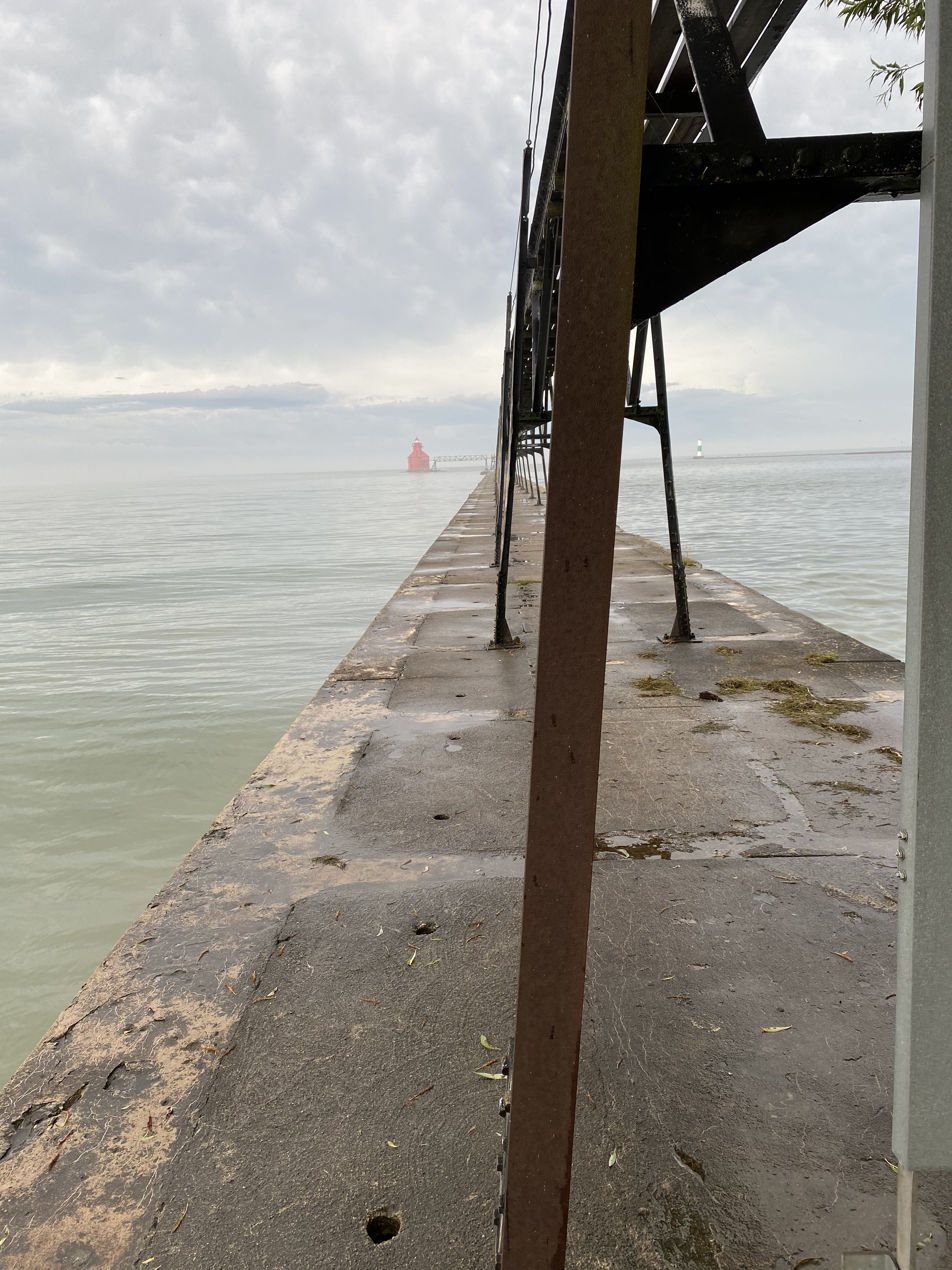
Sturgeon Bay Canal North Pierhead Light adjacent to the station
