= Sturgeon Bay (town), Wisconsin =

Wisconsin town

Sturgeon Bay, Wisconsin
- Town
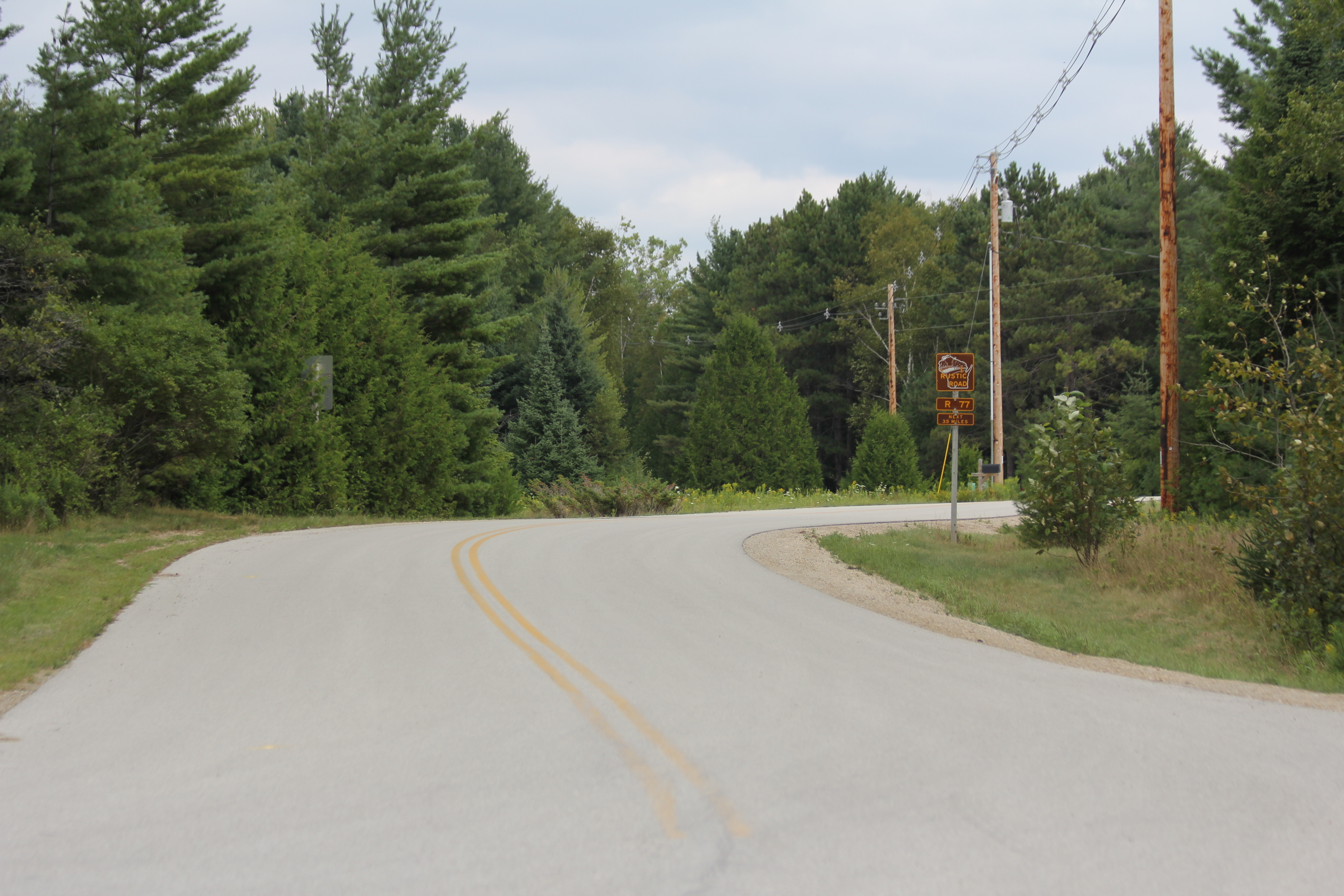
- Looking north from the southern terminus of Rustic Road R77 in the eastern part of the town

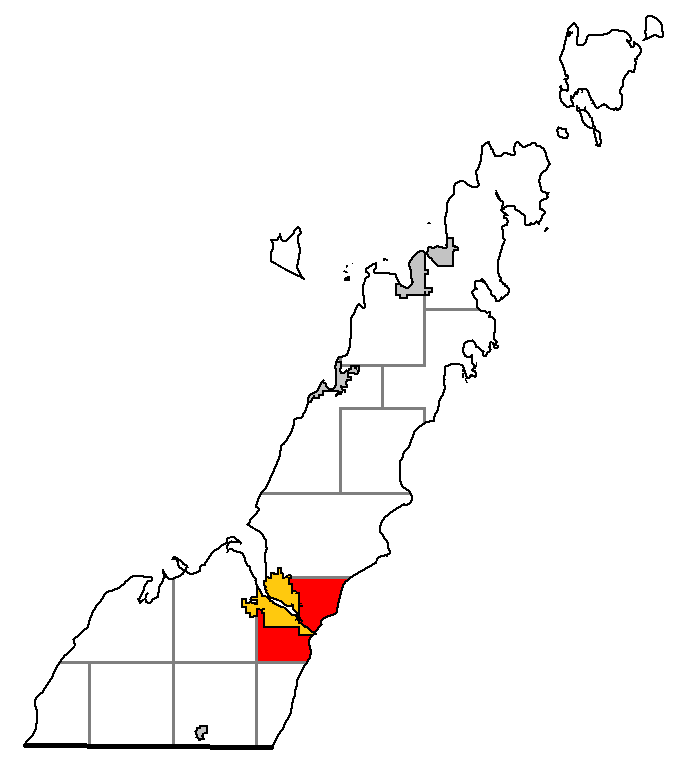
- Location of Sturgeon Bay, within Door County
- Coordinates: 44°48′38″N 87°18′56″W
- Country: United States
- State: Wisconsin
- County: Door

Area
  - Total: 35.2 sq mi (91.1 km^{2})
  - Land: 19.3 sq mi (50.0 km^{2})
  - Water: 15.9 sq mi (41.1 km^{2})
- Elevation: 577 ft (176 m)

Population (2020)
  - Total: 821
  - Density: 42.5/sq mi (16.4/km^{2})
- Time zone: UTC-6 (Central (CST))
  - Summer (DST): UTC-5 (CDT)
- Area code: 920
- FIPS code: 55-77900
- GNIS feature ID: 1584240
- Website: https://townofsturgeonbay-wi.gov/

Sturgeon Bay is a town in Door County, Wisconsin, United States. The population was 821 at the 2020 census.

== Geography ==
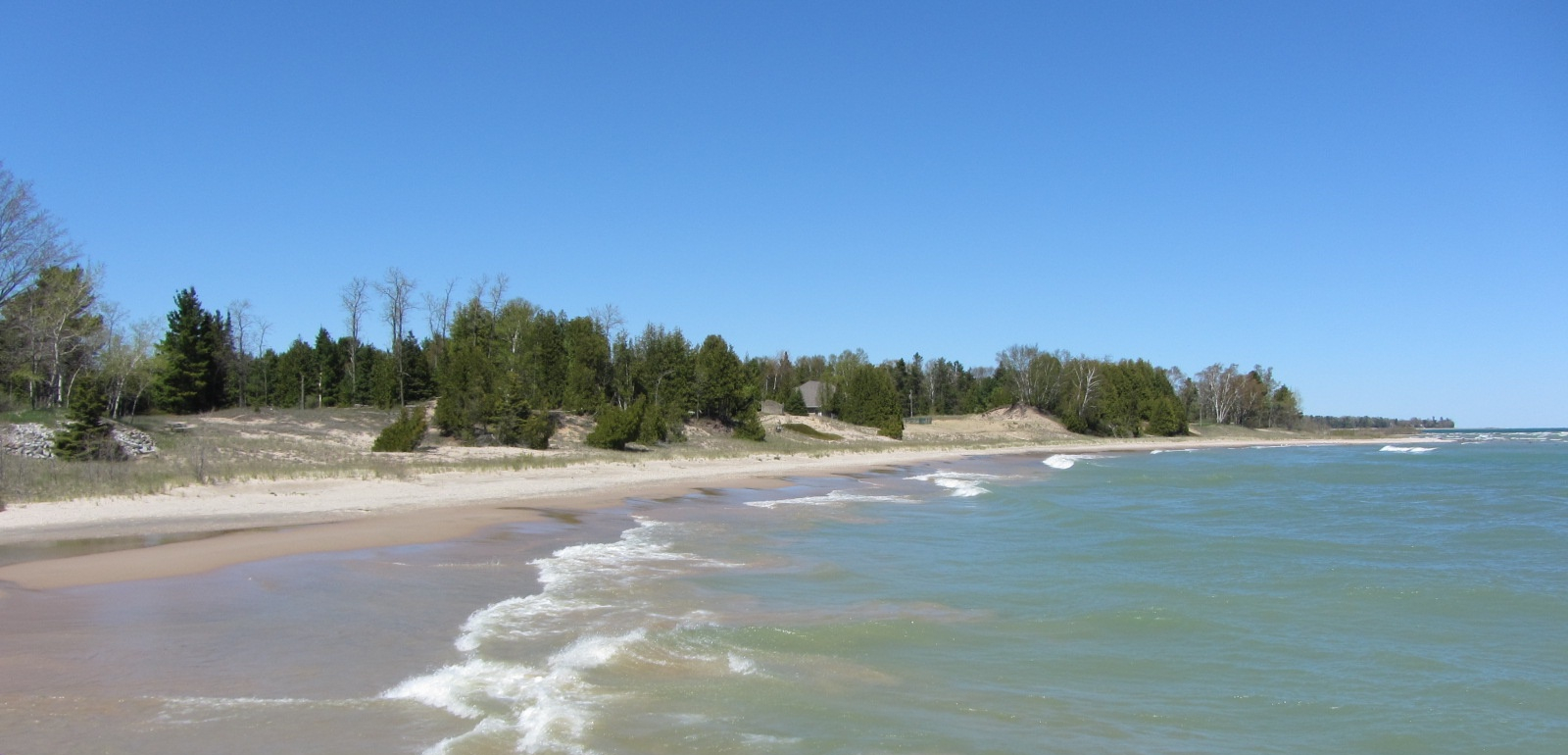
View from Portage Park

A Potawatomi village on the eastern shore (now the Sturgeon Bay Ship Canal) was known as Onegahning, which means "to carry a canoe back and forth".

According to the United States Census Bureau, the town has a total area of 35.2 square miles (91.1 km^{2}), of which 19.3 square miles (50.0 km^{2}) is land and 15.9 square miles (41.1 km^{2}) (45.08%) is water.

== Demographics ==
As of the census of 2000, there were 865 people, 356 households, and 273 families residing in the town. The population density was 44.8 people per square mile (17.3/km^{2}). There were 543 housing units at an average density of 28.1 per square mile (10.9/km^{2}). The racial makeup of the town was 96.53% White, 2.31% Native American, 0.12% Asian, and 1.04% from two or more races. 1.27% of the population were Hispanic or Latino of any race.

There were 356 households, out of which 27.8% had children under the age of 18 living with them, 68.8% were married couples living together, 5.9% had a female householder with no husband present, and 23.3% were non-families. 19.7% of all households were made up of individuals, and 7.0% had someone living alone who was 65 years of age or older. The average household size was 2.43 and the average family size was 2.77.

In the town, the population was spread out, with 20.1% under the age of 18, 6.2% from 18 to 24, 26.9% from 25 to 44, 29.7% from 45 to 64, and 17.0% who were 65 years of age or older. The median age was 44 years. For every 100 females, there were 97.9 males. For every 100 females age 18 and over, there were 103.8 males.

The median income for a household in the town was $42,434, and the median income for a family was $51,250. Males had a median income of $33,750 versus $21,750 for females. The per capita income for the town was $22,397. About 6.6% of families and 8.6% of the population were below the poverty line, including 11.8% of those under age 18 and 4.3% of those age 65 or over.

== See also ==
- Coast Guard Station Sturgeon Bay
