= Sturgeon Bay Canal Light =

Lighthouse at the south entrance to the Sturgeon Bay Ship Canal, Wisconsin

Sturgeon Bay Ship Canal Light
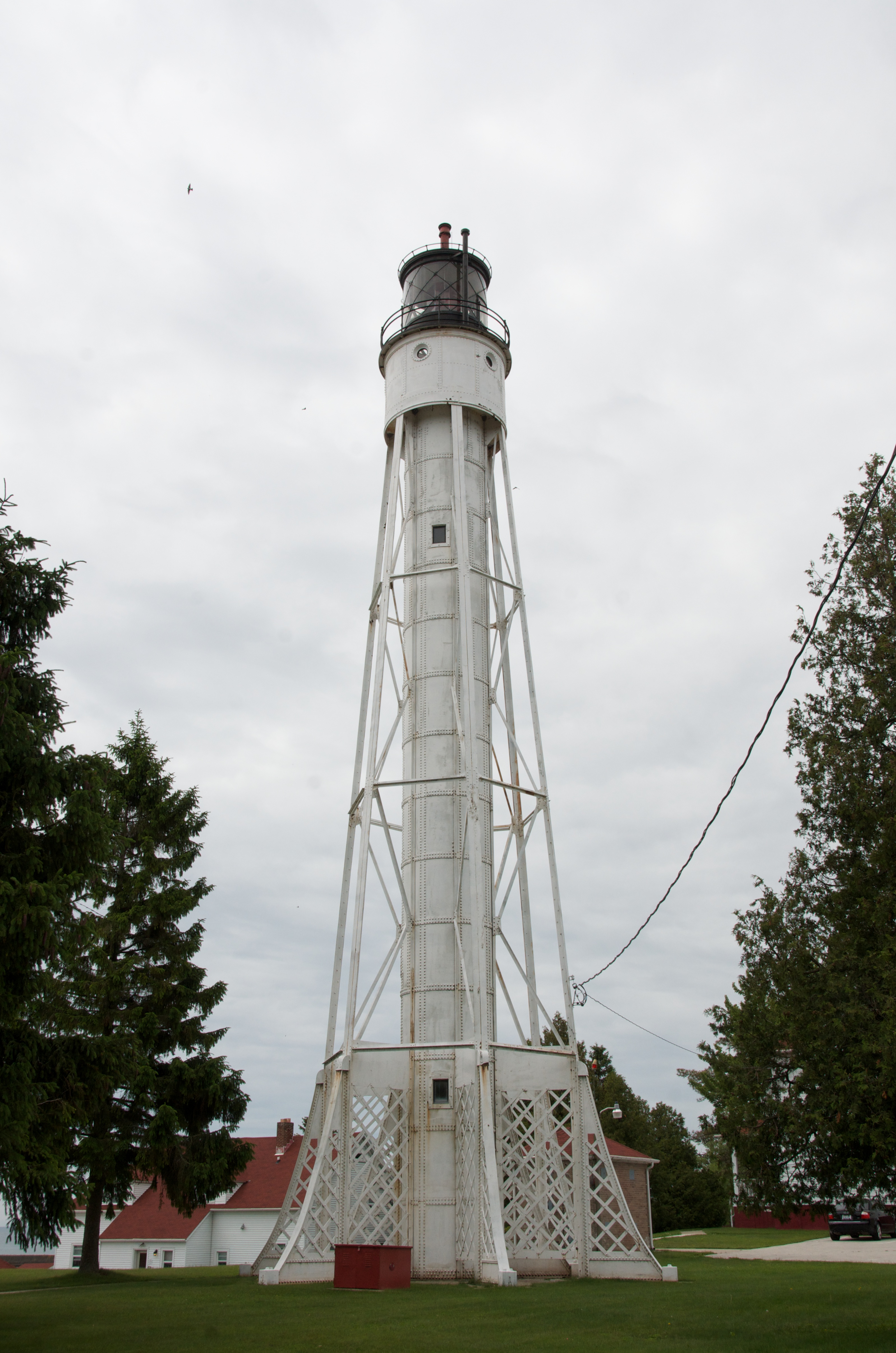
- Location: Sturgeon Bay, Wisconsin
- Coordinates: 44°47′42.038″N 87°18′48.03″W

Tower
- Constructed: 1899
- Foundation: Concrete
- Construction: Steel / Iron
- Height: 98 feet (30 m)
- Shape: Cylindrical
- Heritage: National Register of Historic Places listed place

Light
- First lit: 1899
- Focal height: 32 m (105 ft)
- Lens: Second order Fresnel lens
- Range: 17 nautical miles (31 km; 20 mi)
- Characteristic: Red, flashing 10 s
- Sturgeon Bay Canal Lighthouse
- U.S. National Register of Historic Places
- Area: 0.3 acres (0.12 ha)
- Built: 1899
- MPS: U.S. Coast Guard Lighthouses and Light Stations on the Great Lakes TR (Archived October 17, 2012)
- NRHP reference No.: 84003666
- Added to NRHP: July 19, 1984

The Sturgeon Bay Canal lighthouse is a lighthouse located at the Coast Guard station near Sturgeon Bay in Door County, Wisconsin.

Situated on the east side of the south entrance to the Sturgeon Bay Ship Canal, it was listed in the National Register of Historic Places in 1984, as the Sturgeon Bay Canal Lighthouse. The lighthouse originally was constructed in 1899; instability forced the addition of steel bracing in 1903. It is similar to the reinforced Devils Island Lighthouse.

There are two lighthouses at this location, the other being the Sturgeon Bay Canal North Pierhead Light.

== Gallery ==
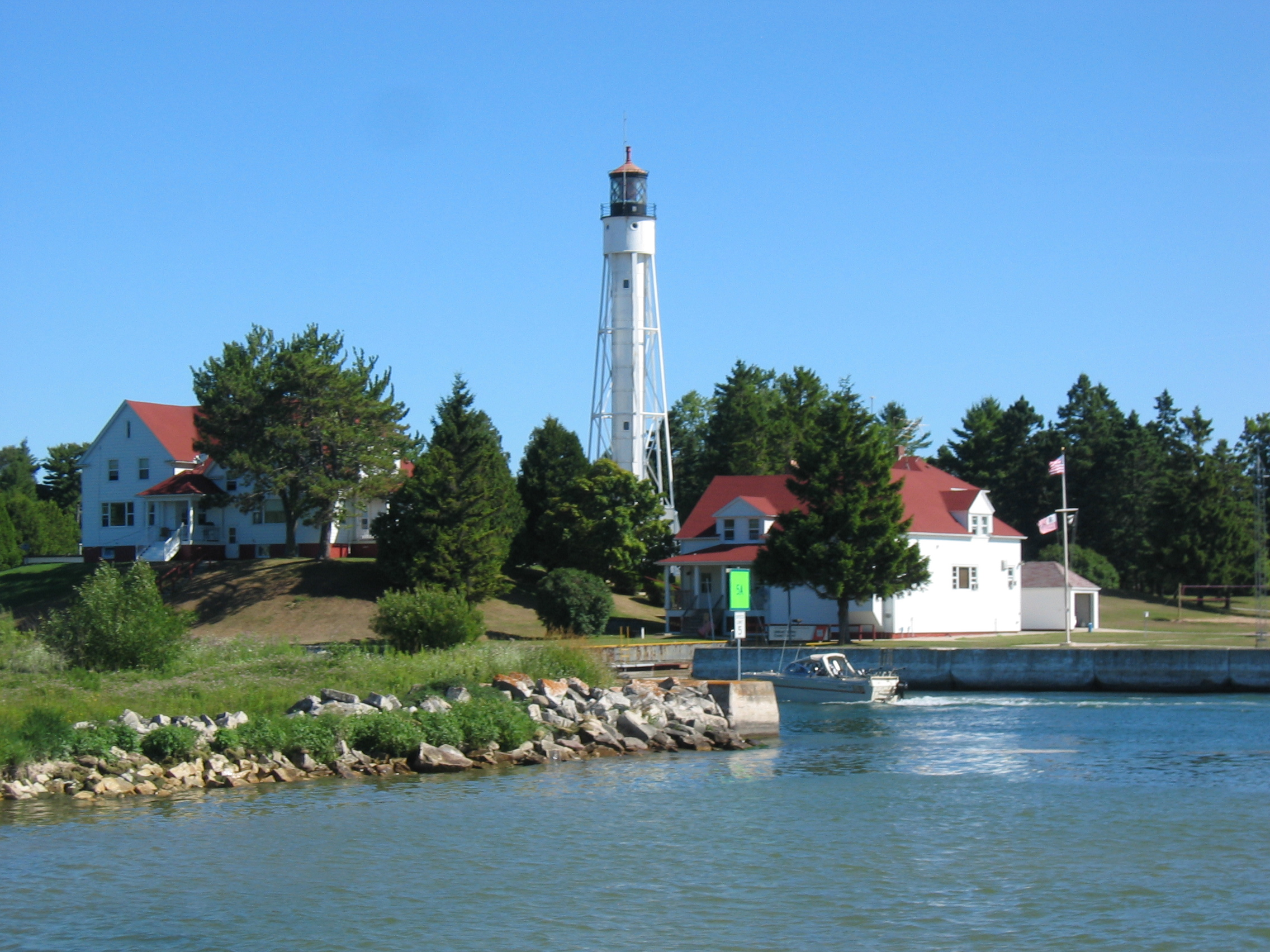
In July

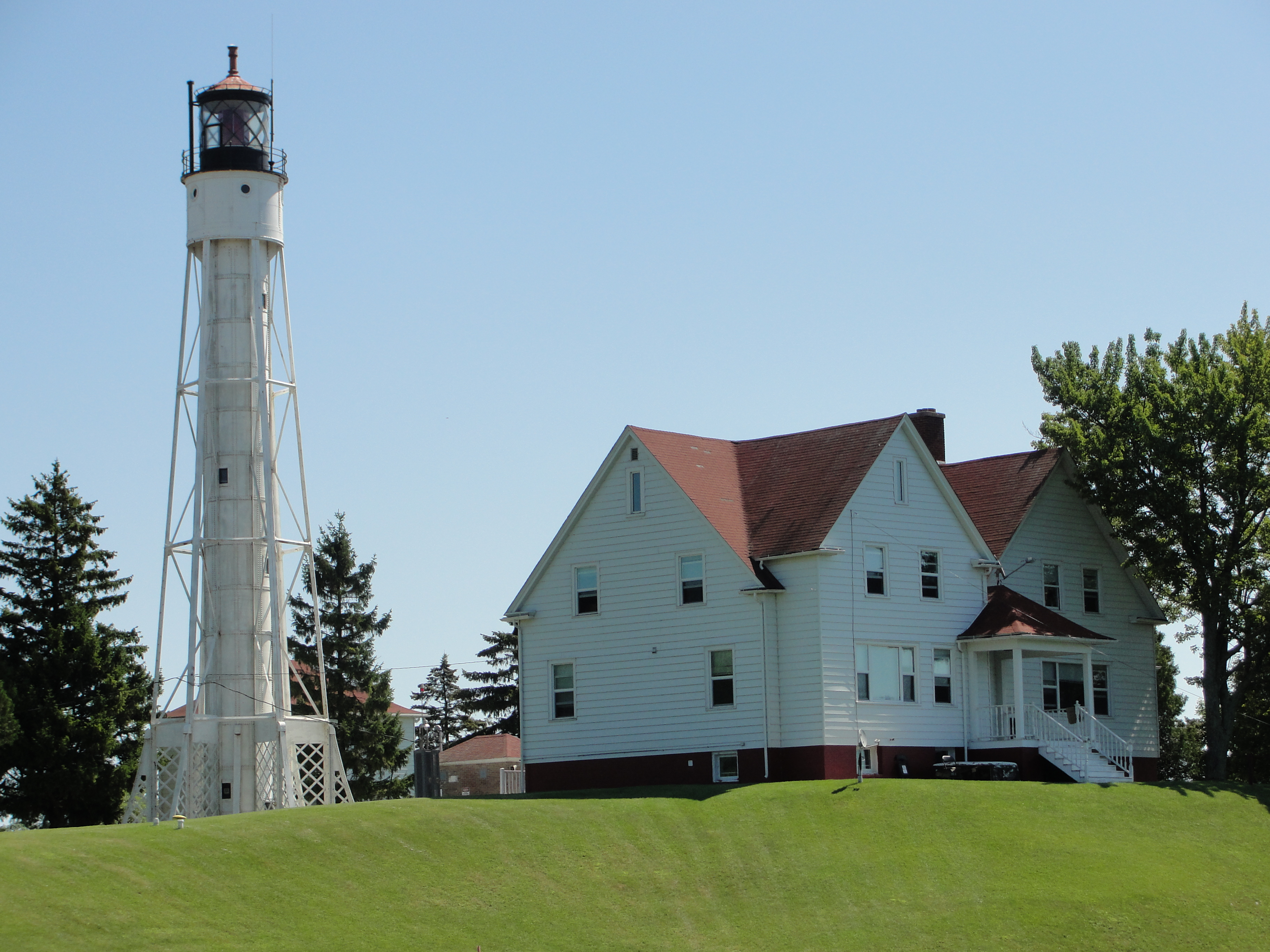
In August

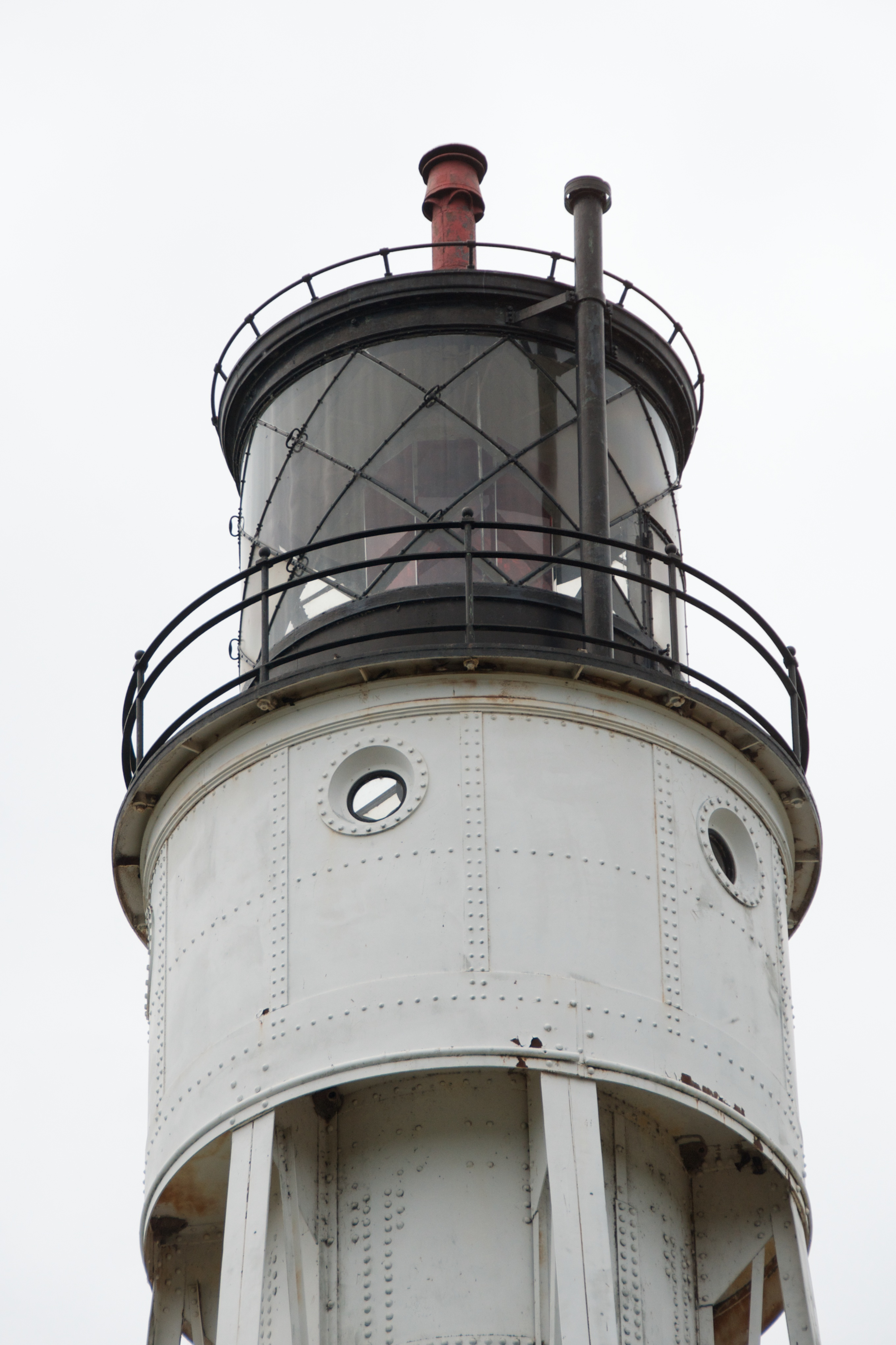
The top
