= Sturgeon Bay Ship Canal =

Canal across the Door Peninsula, Wisconsin

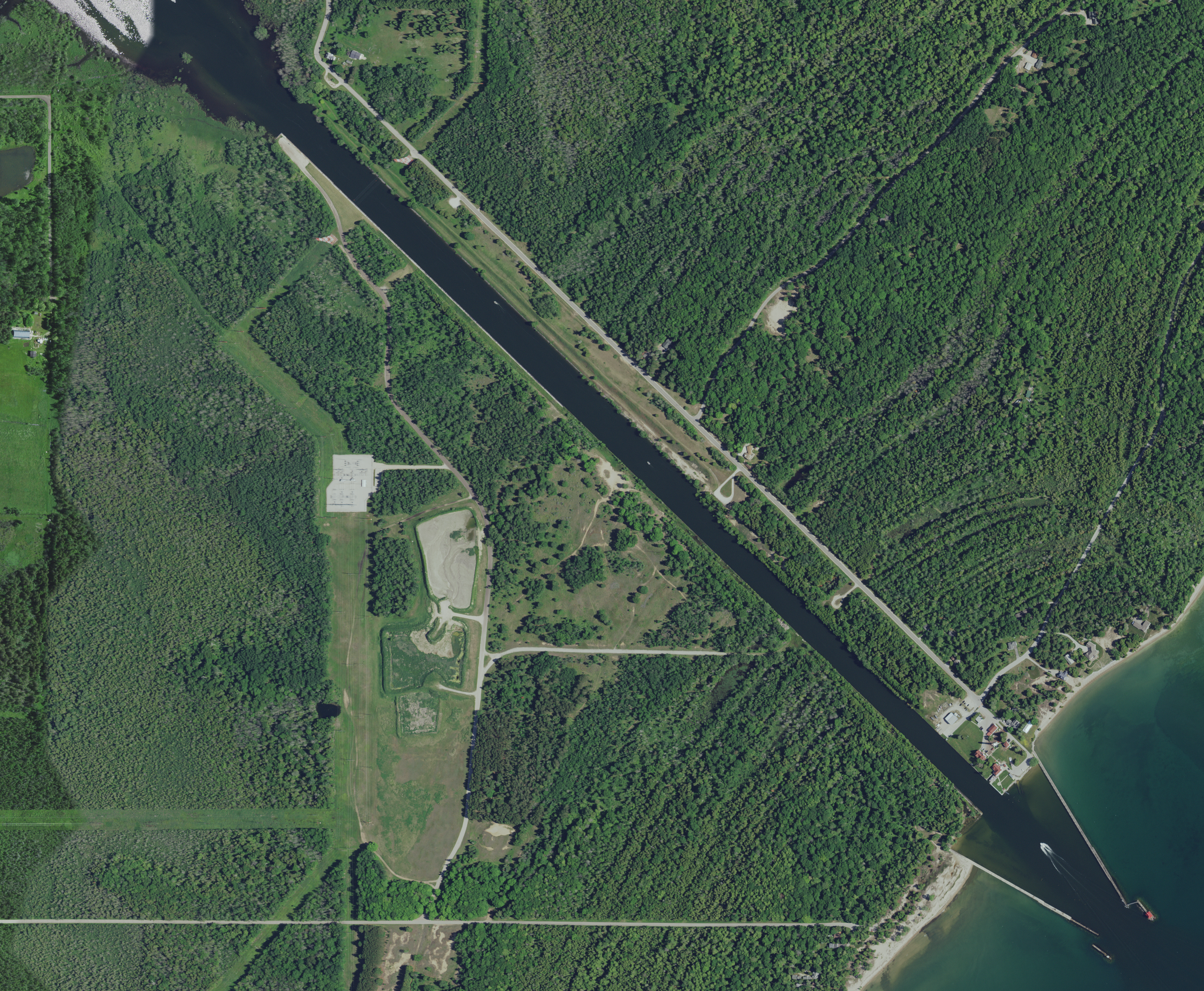
- Aerial view of the canal. Lake Michigan at lower right

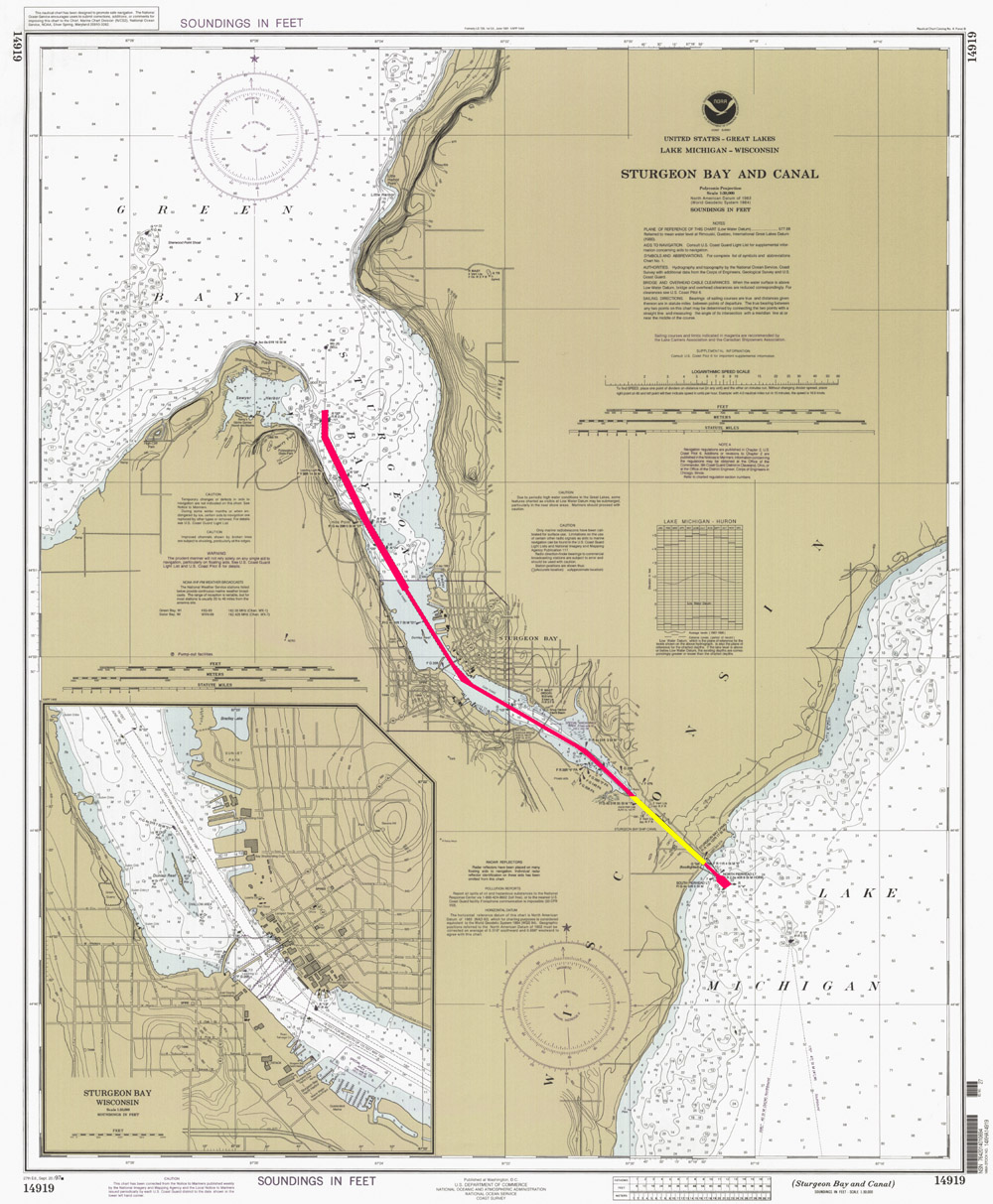
- A 1997 NOAA chart with the canal highlighted in yellow and the dredged channel in red
- Location: Door County, Wisconsin
- Country: United States
- Coordinates: 44°47′56″N 87°19′14″W

Specifications
- Length: 1.3 miles (2.1 km)
- Locks: None
- Status: Open
- Navigation authority: U.S. Army Corps of Engineers

Geography
- Start point: Lake Michigan
- End point: Sturgeon Bay

The Sturgeon Bay Ship Canal is a ship canal connecting Sturgeon Bay with Lake Michigan across the Door Peninsula in Door County, Wisconsin. A dredged channel continues through Sturgeon Bay to Green Bay. This combined waterway allows ships to sail between Lake Michigan and Green Bay without traversing the dangerous Porte des Morts strait.

The canal is approximately 1.3 miles (2.1 km) long, cutting through the eastern side of the peninsula in a northwest-to-southeast orientation. There are no locks.

== History ==
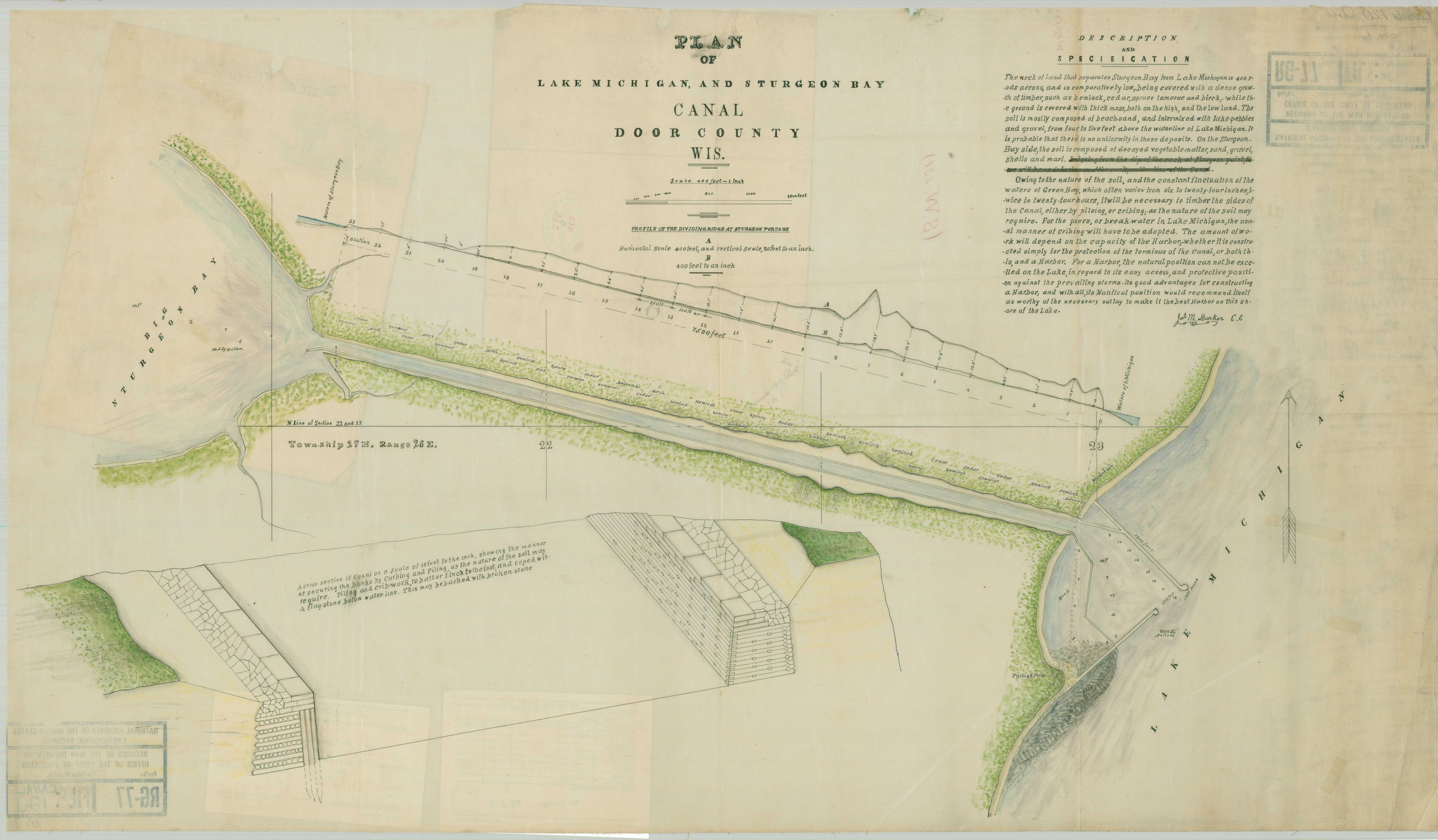
Canal plans, 1867

The Sturgeon Bay Ship Canal was dug by a private group headed by then-president of Chicago and North Western Railway, William B. Ogden, between July 8, 1872 and the late fall of 1881. Although smaller craft began using the canal in 1880, it was not open for large-scale watercraft until 1890. Timber along the canal route was burned to get rid of it instead of being used for wood.

The cost of completing the 1.3-mile (2.1 km) cut in 1881 was $291,461.69.

In 1893, the Ogden private investors group sold all interest in the canal to the United States government. Since that time, the canal has been maintained by the U.S. Army Corps of Engineers.

== Description ==
The original canal was 100 feet (30 m) wide and 6 feet (1.8 m) deep. As of May 2016, the canal was 125 feet (38 m) wide and 20 feet (6.1 m) deep. Two jetties frame the canal's southeast entrance, each extending about 1,200 feet (370 m) into Lake Michigan.

Several famous lighthouses mark the course of the canal and channel, including the Sturgeon Bay Canal Lighthouse at the eastern entrance on the northern side of the canal (approximately 230 feet (70 m) from Lake Michigan) next to Coast Guard Station Sturgeon Bay; the Sturgeon Bay Canal North Pierhead Light on the Lake Michigan coastline; and the Sherwood Point Lighthouse in Idlewild, on the far western end, on the southern shore of the outer edge of Sturgeon Bay.

== Gallery ==
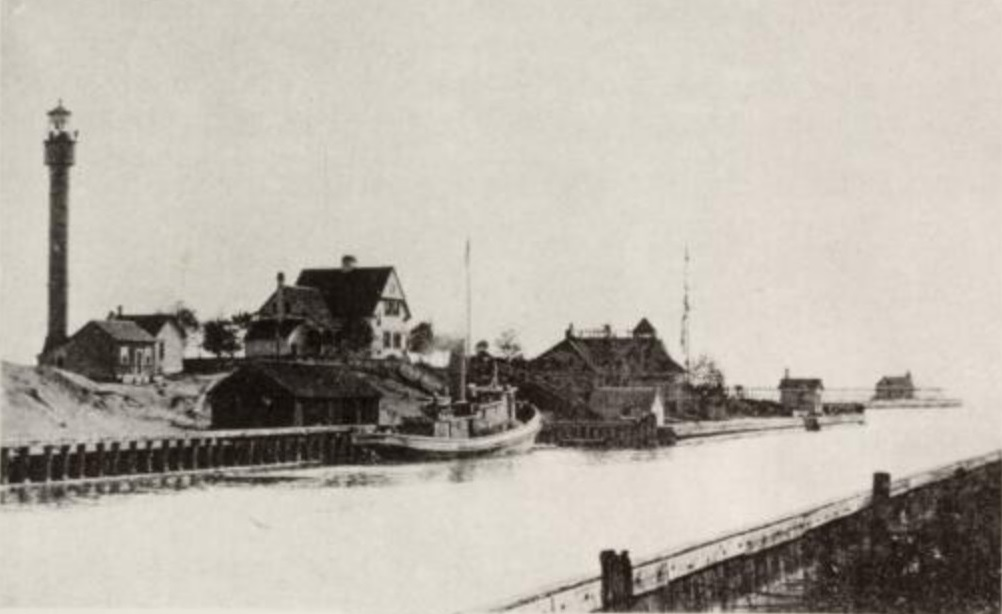
Sturgeon Bay Canal from a postcard postmarked in 1899

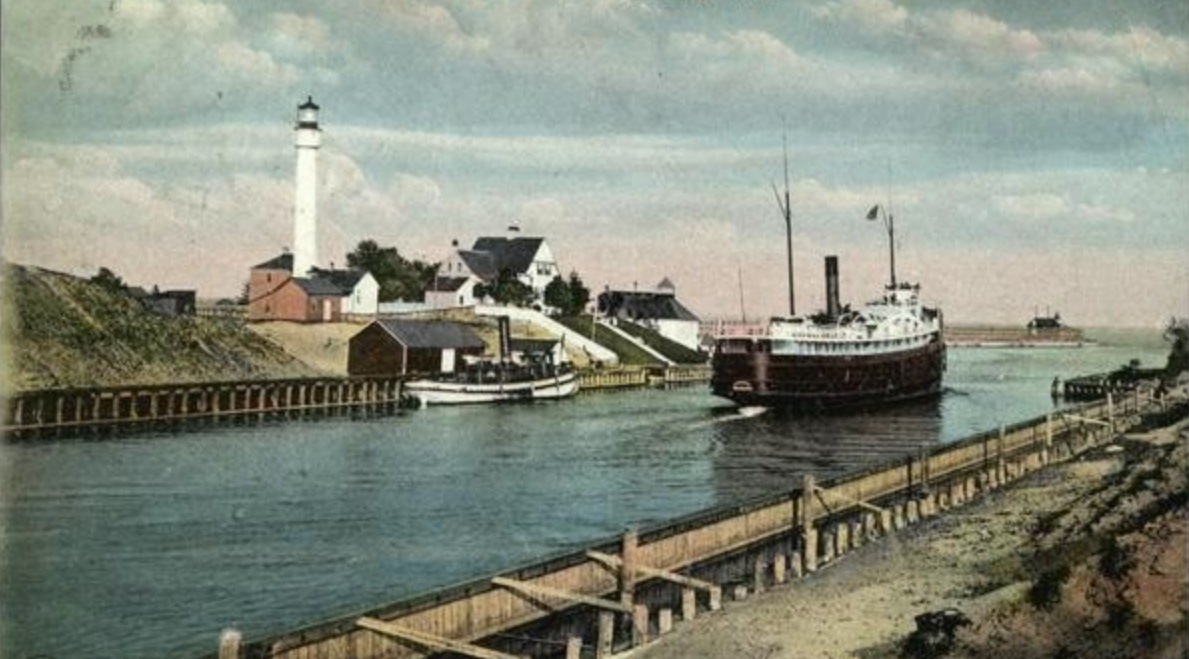
From a postcard postmarked in 1909

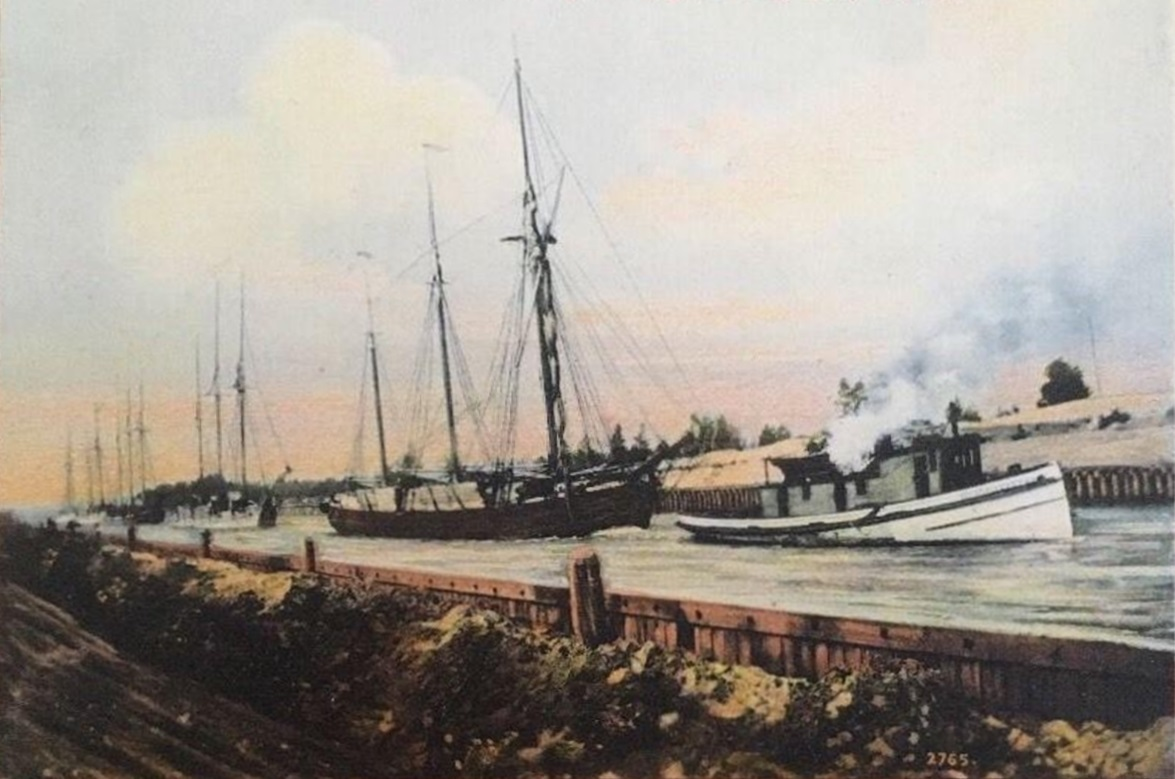
A towing scene through Sturgeon Bay Ship Canal

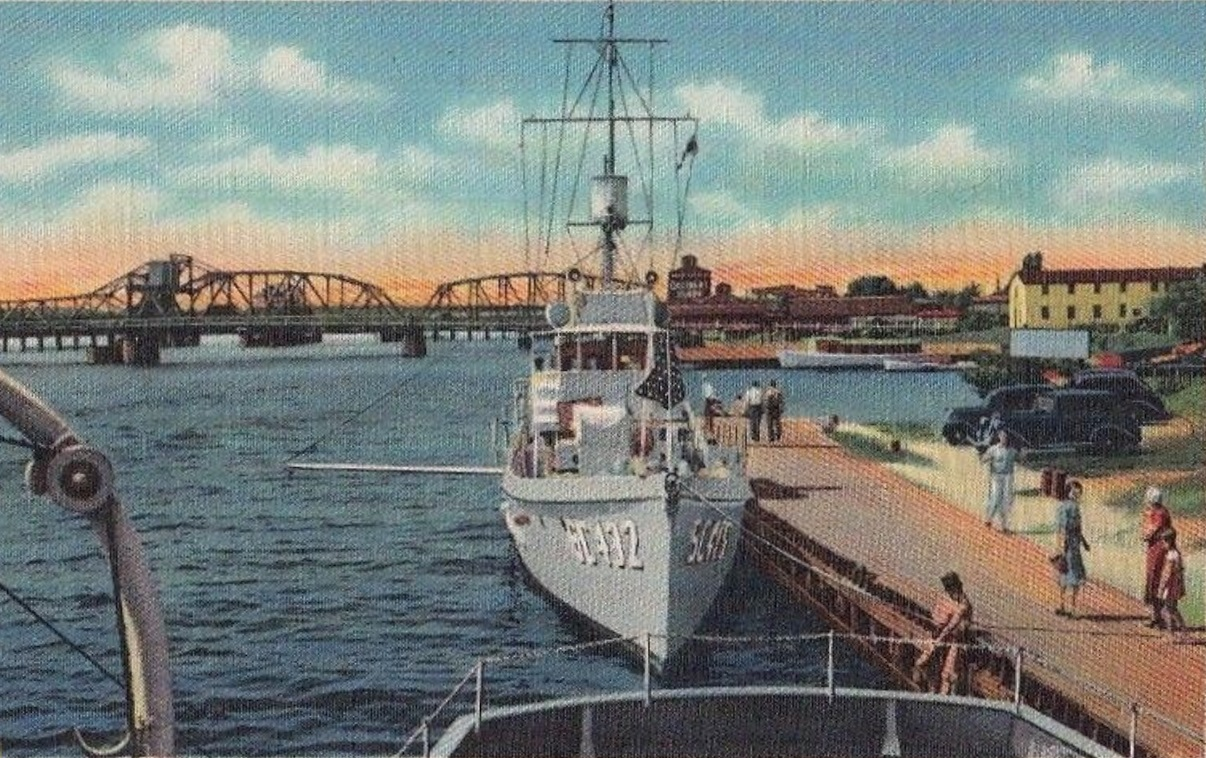
Canal and bridge at the boat docks

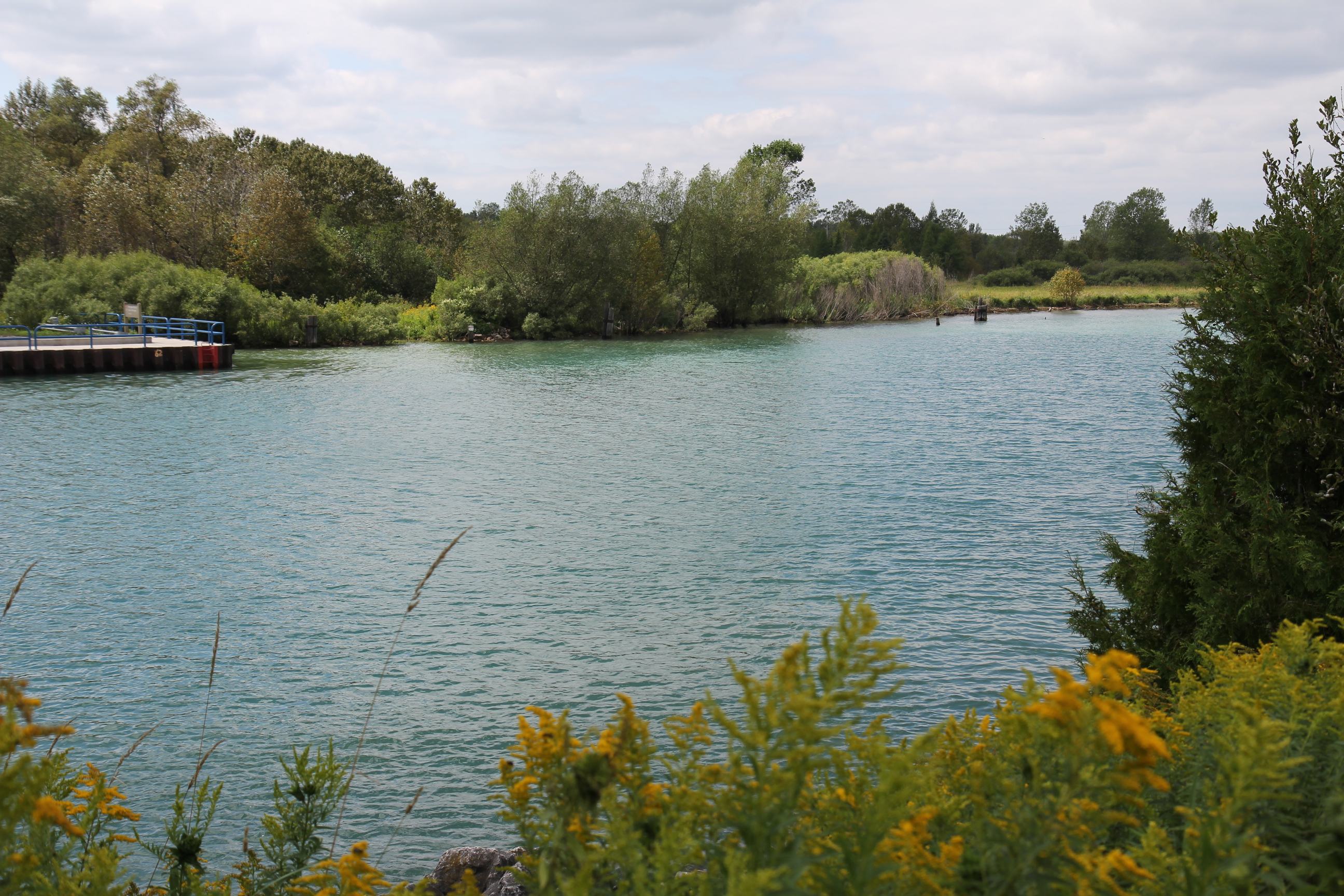
Dug portion of canal from the berm on the north side

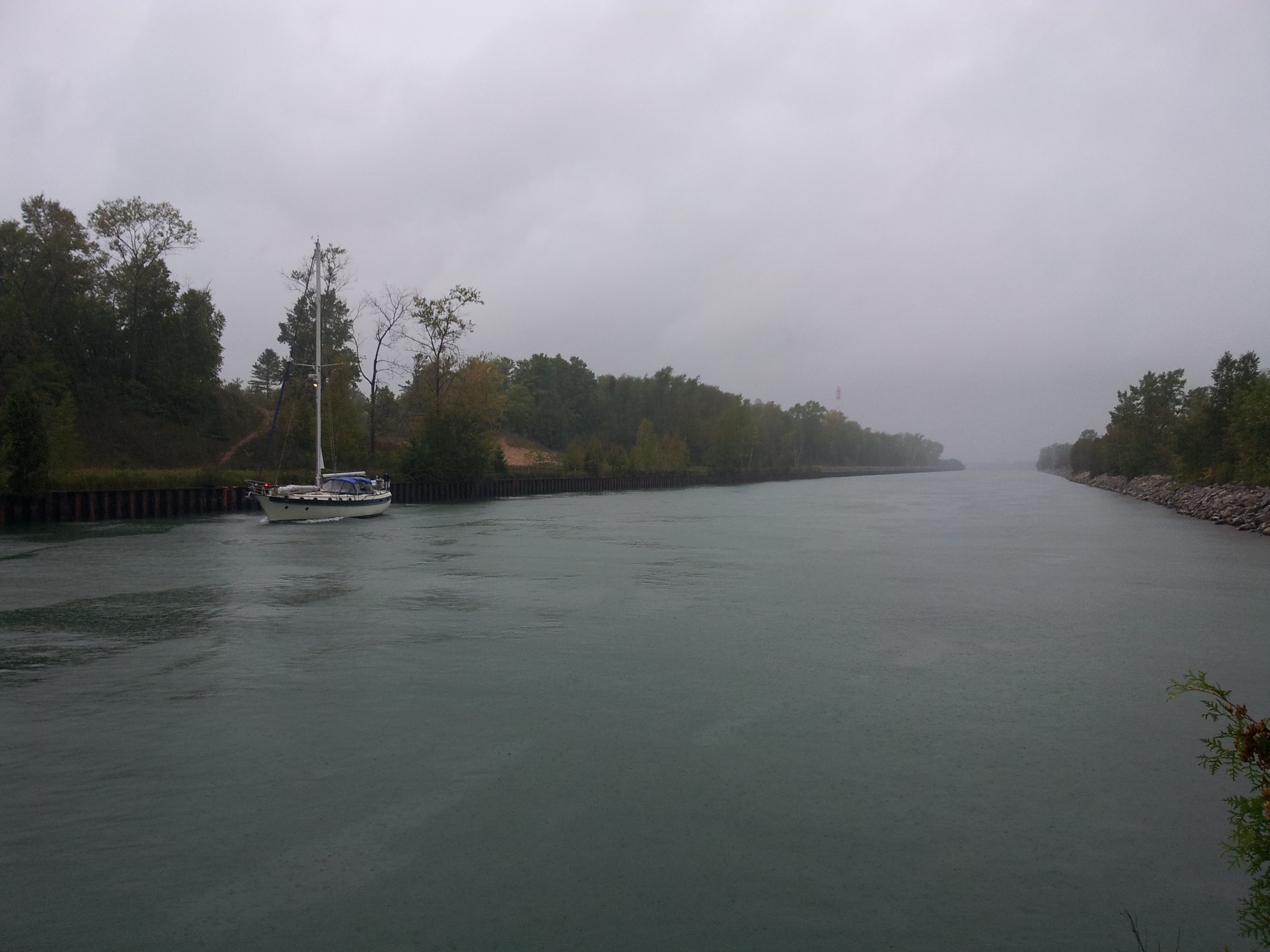
Boat passing eastward through the Sturgeon Bay Canal in stormy weather (September 2013).

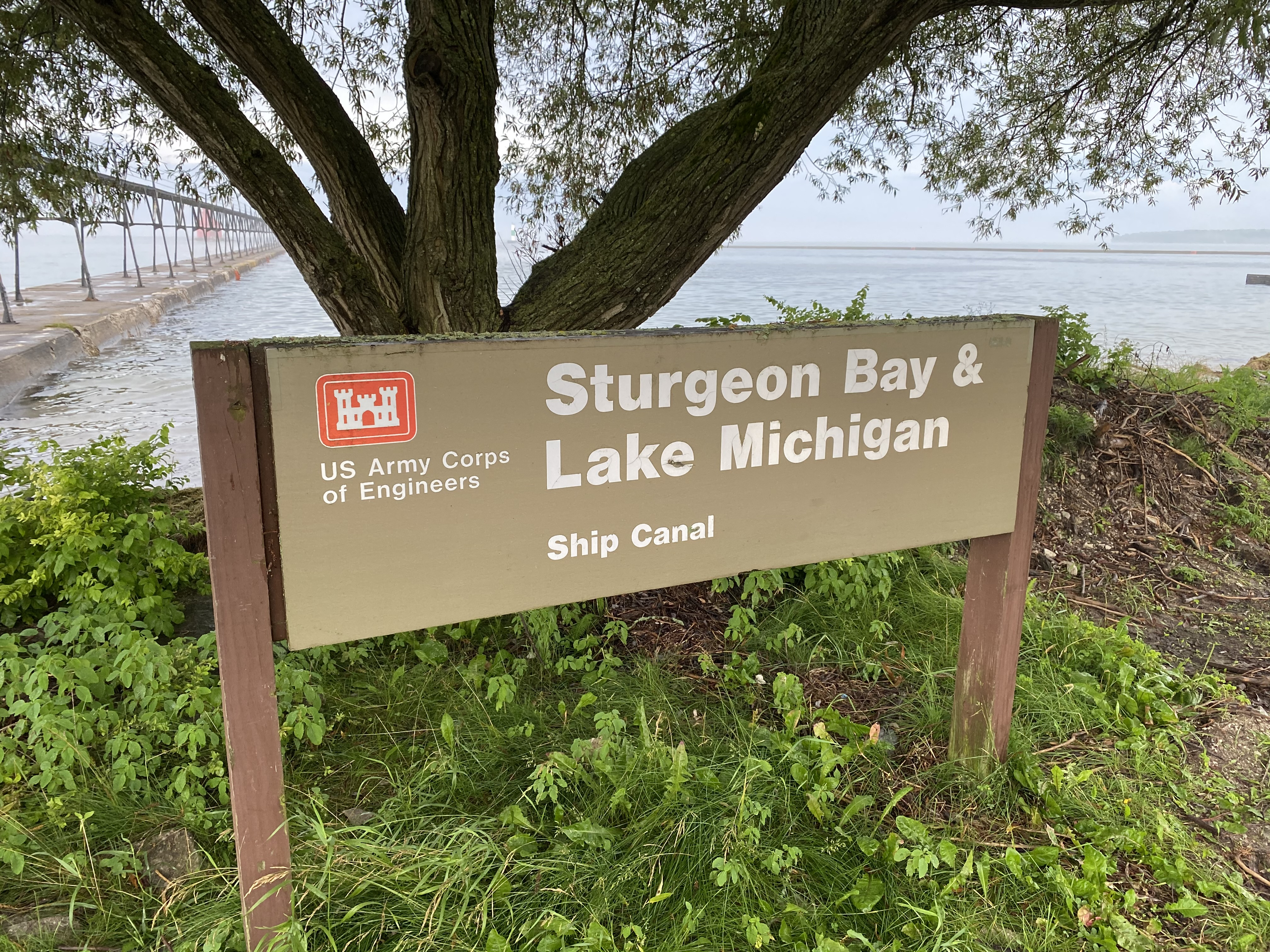
U.S. Army Corps of Engineers sign

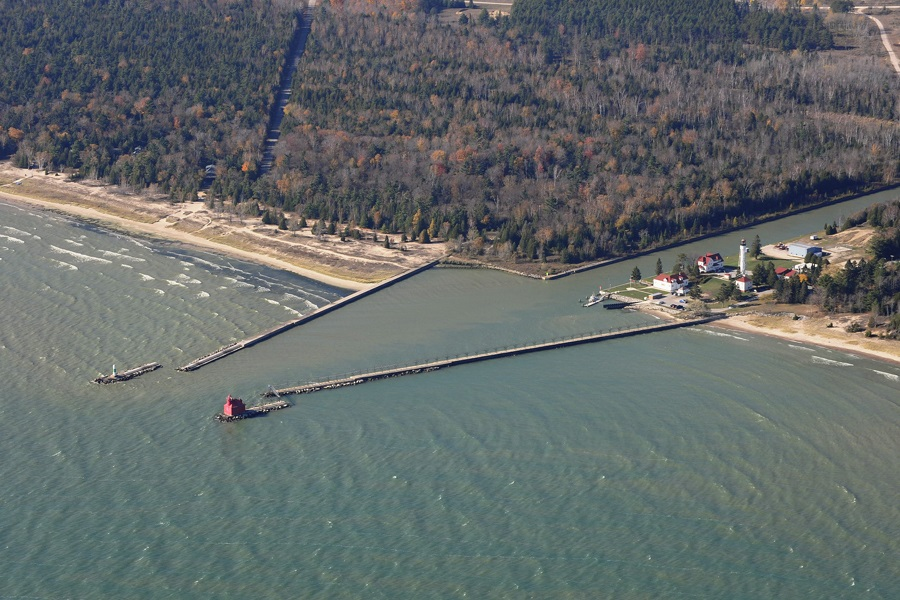
Piers at the east end of the canal

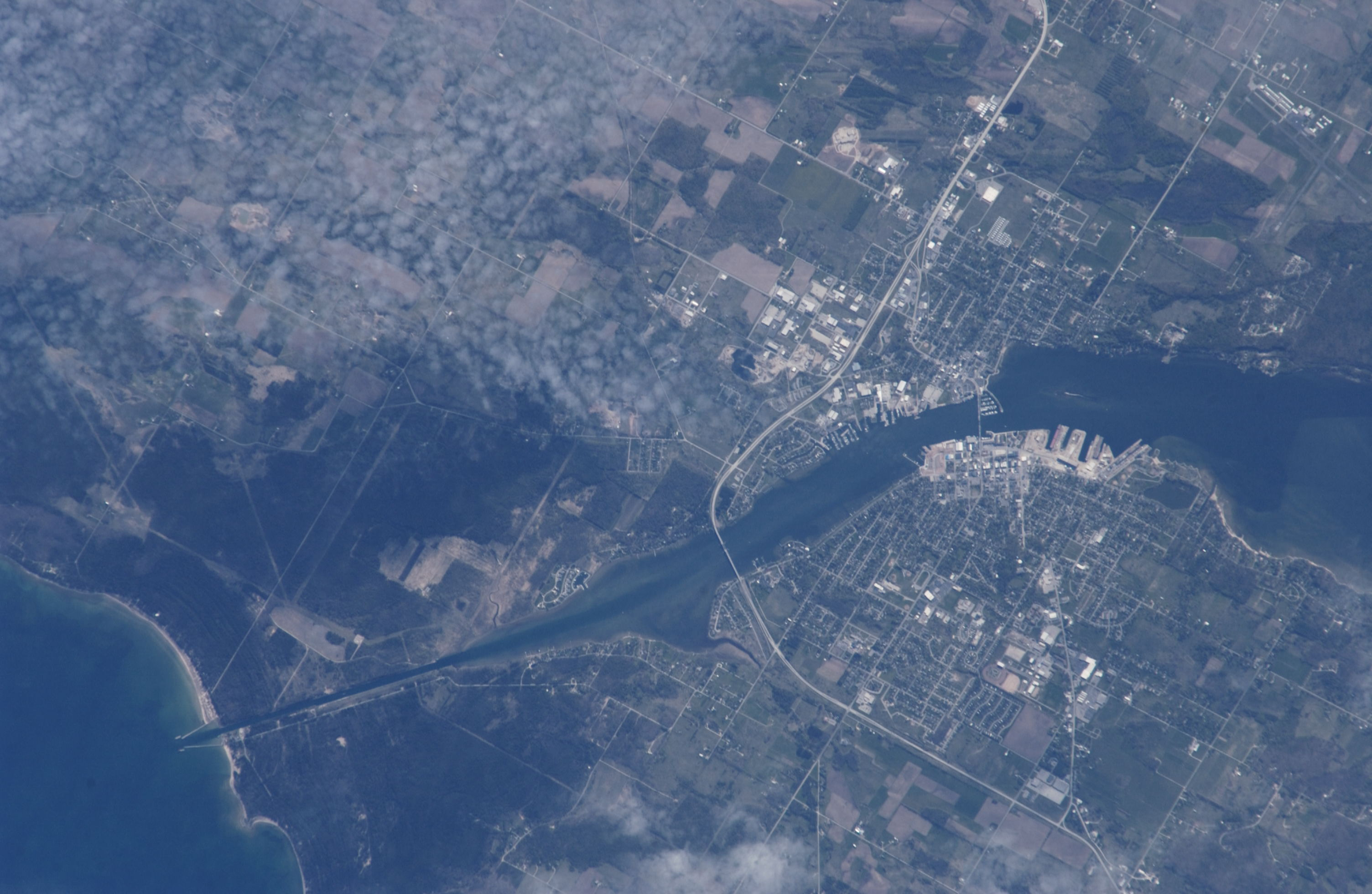
The canal (lower left) on May 16, 2005, taken from the International Space Station
