= Sturgeon Bay Canal North Pierhead Light =

Lighthouse in Wisconsin, United States

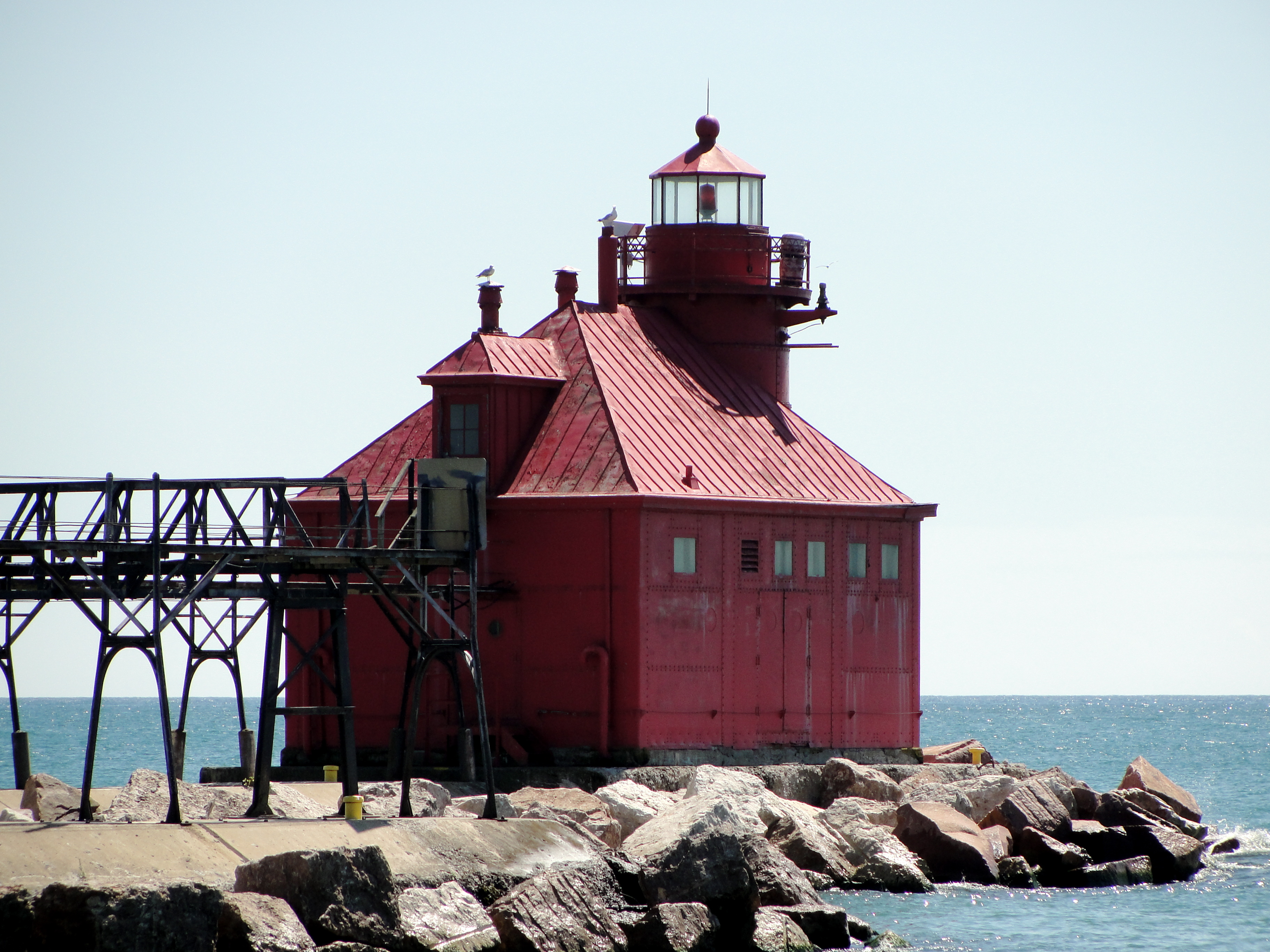
- Location: Sturgeon Bay, Wisconsin
- Coordinates: 44°47′31.26″N 87°18′34.322″W

Tower
- Constructed: 1882 (First); 1903 (Current)
- Foundation: Concrete
- Construction: Cast iron
- Height: 39 feet (12 m)
- Shape: Cylindrical on square fog signal house

Light
- First lit: 1903
- Focal height: 12 m (39 ft)
- Lens: Sixth order Fresnel lens (original), 12 inches (300 mm) Tideland Signal ML-300 acrylic lens (current)
- Range: 9 nautical miles (17 km; 10 mi)
- Characteristic: Red, flashing 2.5 s

The Sturgeon Bay Canal North Pierhead Light is a lighthouse located on Sturgeon Bay in Door County, Wisconsin.

Painted red, the light is situated on the north pier of the southern entrance to the Sturgeon Bay Ship Canal.

There are two lighthouses at this location, the other being the Sturgeon Bay Canal Lighthouse.

== Gallery ==
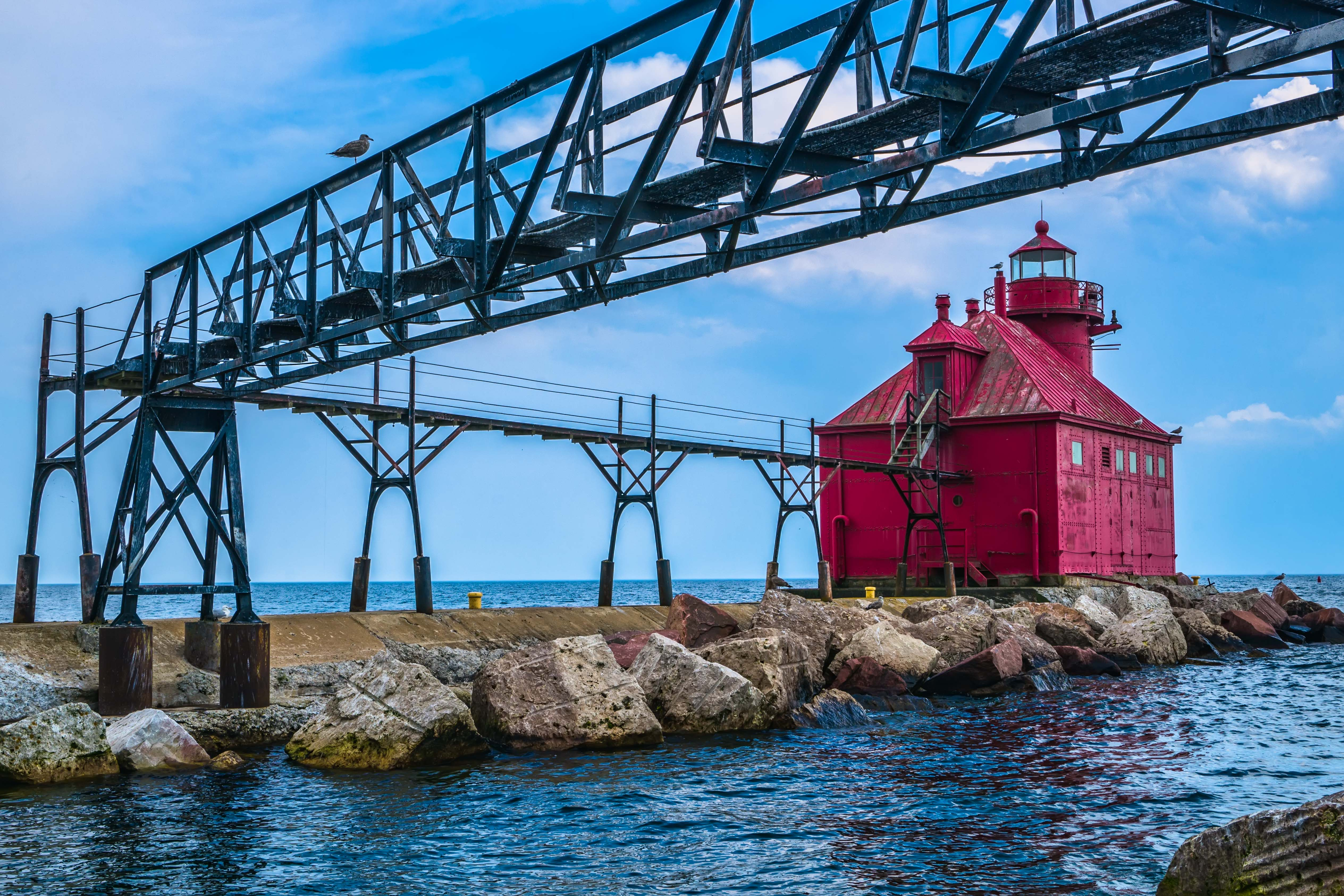
Sturgeon Bay Canal North Pierhead Lighthouse

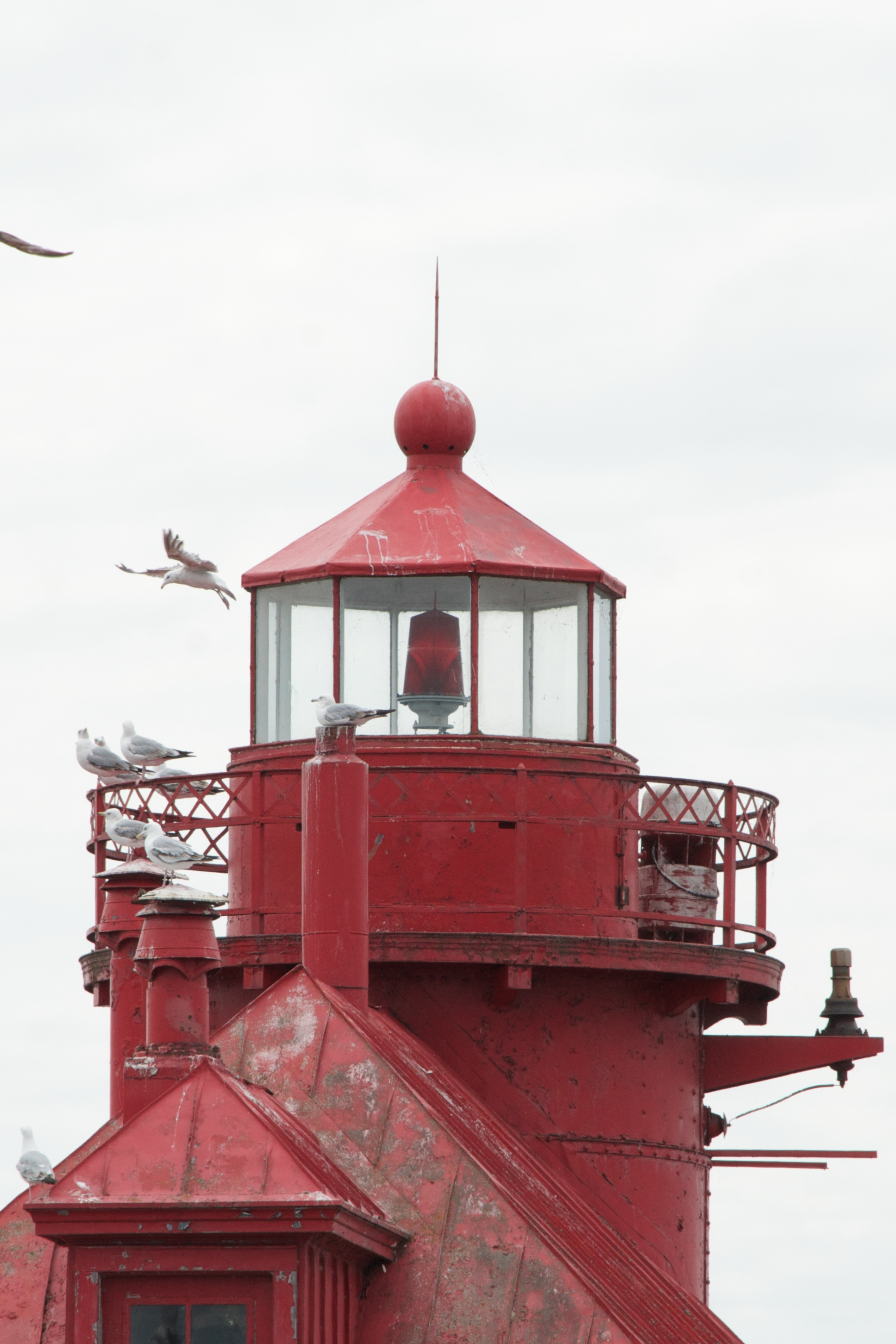
Closeup of the tower

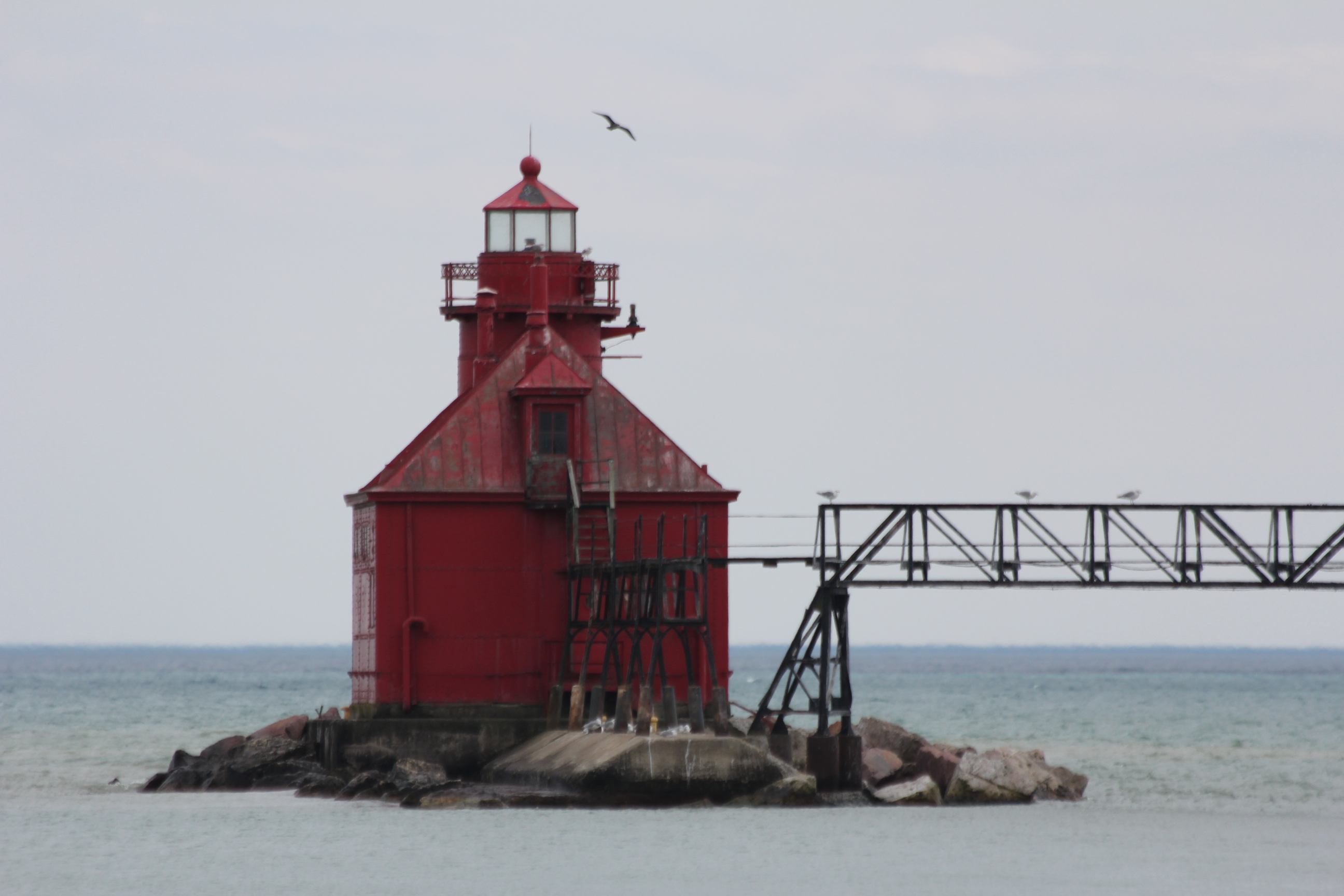
Backside

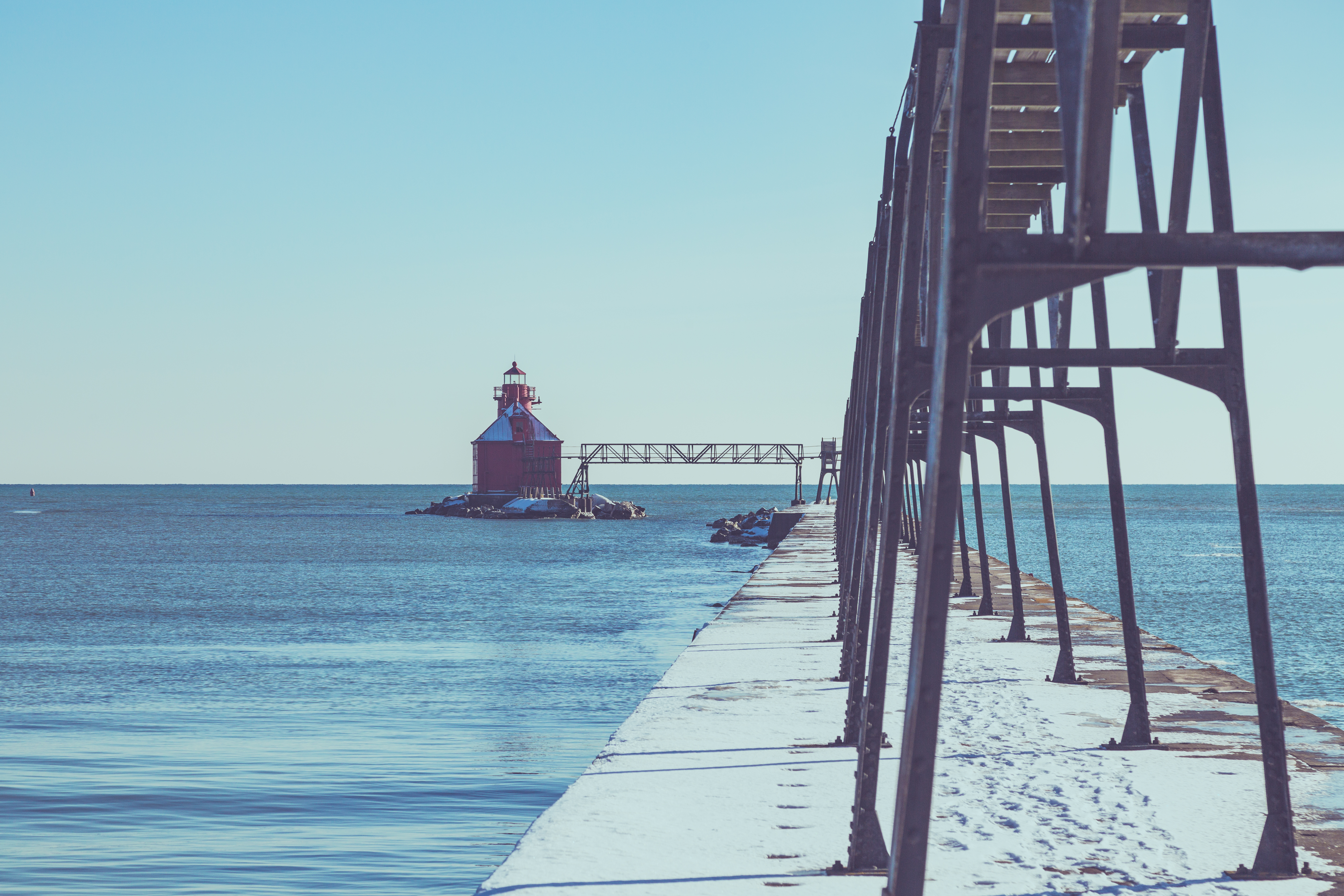
On January 1st

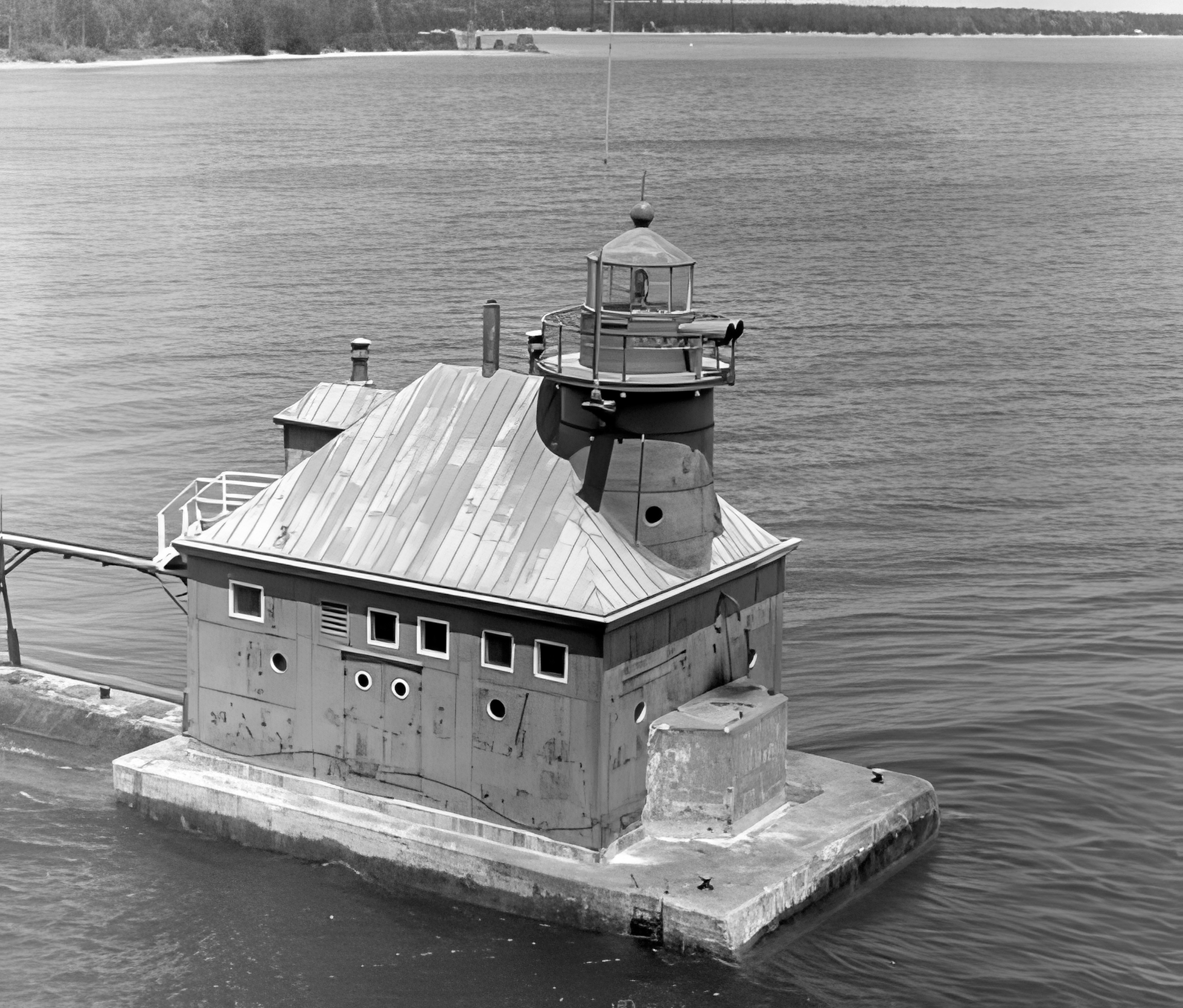
U.S. Coast Guard Archival Photo
