= Potawatomi State Park =

State park in Wisconsin, United States

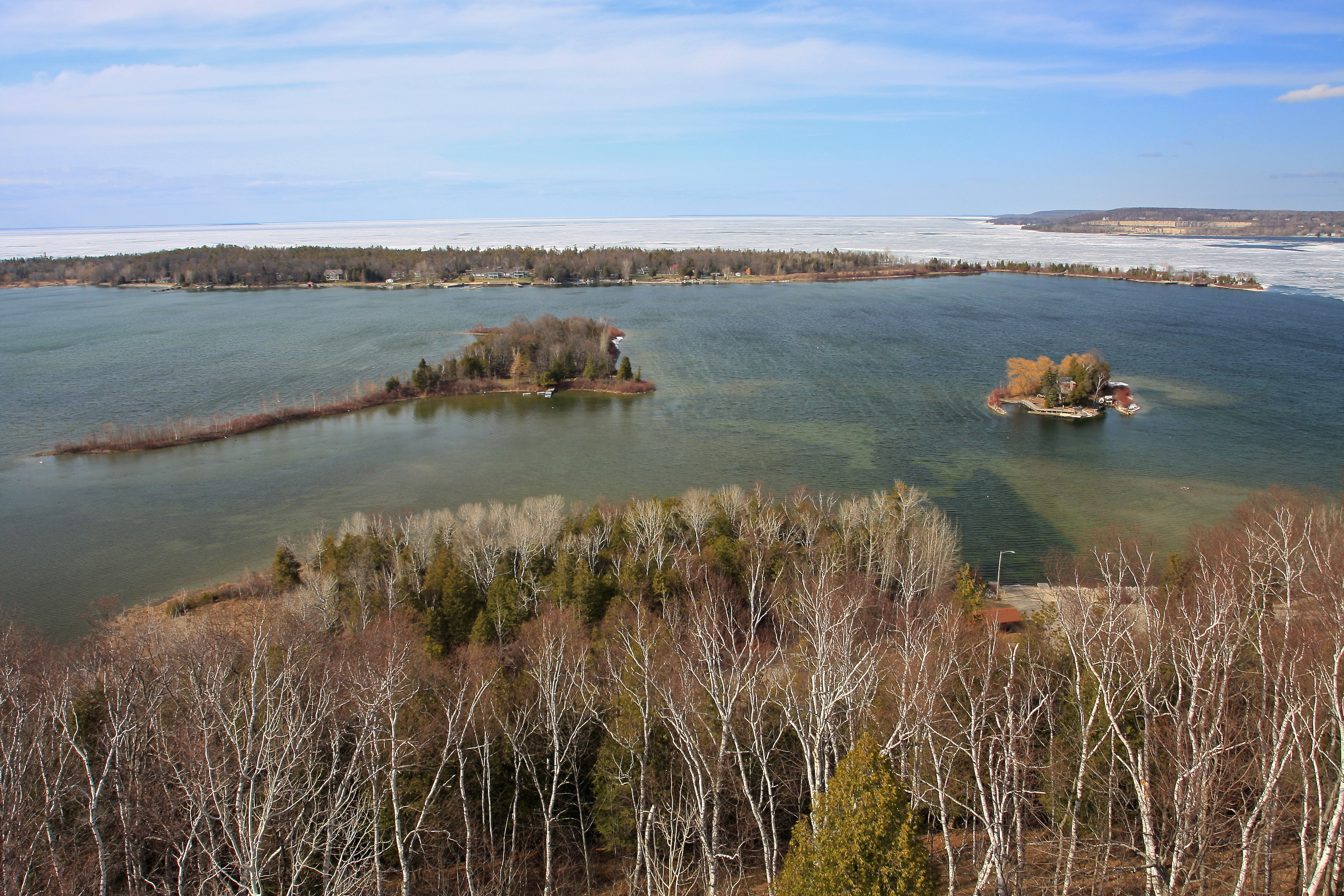
- Sawyer Harbor

- Location within Wisconsin Location within the United States
- Interactive map of Potawatomi State Park
- Location: Door County, Wisconsin, United States
- Coordinates: 44°51′52″N 87°24′54″W
- Area: 1,225 acres (496 ha)
- Established: 1928
- Administrator: Wisconsin Department of Natural Resources
- Website: Official website
- Wisconsin State Parks

Potawatomi State Park is a 1,225-acre (496 ha) Wisconsin state park northwest of the city of Sturgeon Bay, Wisconsin in the Town of Nasewaupee. It is located in Door County along Sturgeon Bay, a bay within the bay of Green Bay. Potawatomi State Park was established in 1928.

== History ==
The federal government began a quarry operation at what is now Potawatomi State Park in 1834. Two years later, the Menominee ceded their claim to the Door Peninsula, including the area which became Potawatomi State Park, to the United States in the 1831 Treaty of Washington. Following the treaty the lands surrounding what is now the park were opened to settlement, which meant that the more decentralized Potawatomi in the area were divested of their land without compensation.

In 1837 the federal government enacted a 1,000 acre federal reservation on the site. This legal designation prevented the area from being sold to settlers or absentee landowners. Instead it was reserved for federal ownership and came to be called "Government Bluff". The rationale for not selling the land was twofold. The area was considered strategically valuable for military purposes because it had a commanding view of Sturgeon Bay and Green Bay. In addition the land was valuable because high quality dolomite could be quarried from the area.

The nature and scenic resources of Government Bluff were apparently coveted by the local inhabitants. Historical accounts give the distinct impression that the reservation's inaccessibility to the public was an unpopular restriction. Quarry operation never grew to the extent of several other local quarries, but the property remained in federal ownership until 1928.

Potawatomi State Park was created in 1928 by the Wisconsin state legislature after the purchase of 1,046.10 acres from the federal government. During the ten succeeding years after the property was purchase, facilities for camping, picnicking, and hiking were developed.

In the 1950s, other improvements to the park were made, including new toilets, park service building, and a new picnic shelter. A new park office building was built in 1983–1984.

An interesting facet to the history of the park was the development of a winter sports recreation area. The facilities were developed in 1941 in cooperation with a group of winter sports enthusiasts known as the Sturgeon Bay Winter Sports Club. Downhill skiing, tobogganing, and ski-jumping were popular activities. Tows for skiers and tobogganers were provided as were rental equipment, food, and beverages.

The area was operated by different groups with various names over the years. The area at one time exclusively a downhill ski hill with two main ski runs and a recently installed chairlift. A non-profit corporation, the Potawatomi Ski Club, leased the ski area from the state and operated it for public recreation.

The ski hill closed following the 1997–1998 season due to an insufficient number of volunteers, club members being made personally responsible for maintenance expenditures, and a string of mild winters.

== Activities and amenities ==
The park's hiking trails include is the eastern terminus of the Ice Age National Scenic Trail. Trails are used for hiking, bicycling, cross-country skiing, and snowmobiling. The park has two miles of water frontage on Green Bay which provides opportunities for boating, canoeing, and fishing.

== Climate ==
Hills Point (within the park)

Climate chart (precipitation, max. and min. temperature)
J	F	M	A	M	J	J	A	S	O	N	D
57 −7 −12	54 −6 −12	60 −1 −7	129 11 −2	93 16 4	85 20 12	97 24 15	78 23 14	87 20 11	129 11 6	85 2 −1	65 −4 −8
- █ Average max. and min. temperatures in °C
- █ Precipitation totals in mm
Imperial conversion
J	F	M	A	M	J	J	A	S	O	N	D
2.2 19 10	2.1 21 10	2.4 30 19	5.1 52 28	3.7 61 39	3.3 68 54	3.8 75 59	3.1 73 57	3.4 68 52	5.1 52 43	3.3 36 30	2.6 25 18
- █ Average max. and min. temperatures in °F
- █ Precipitation totals in inches

== Gallery ==
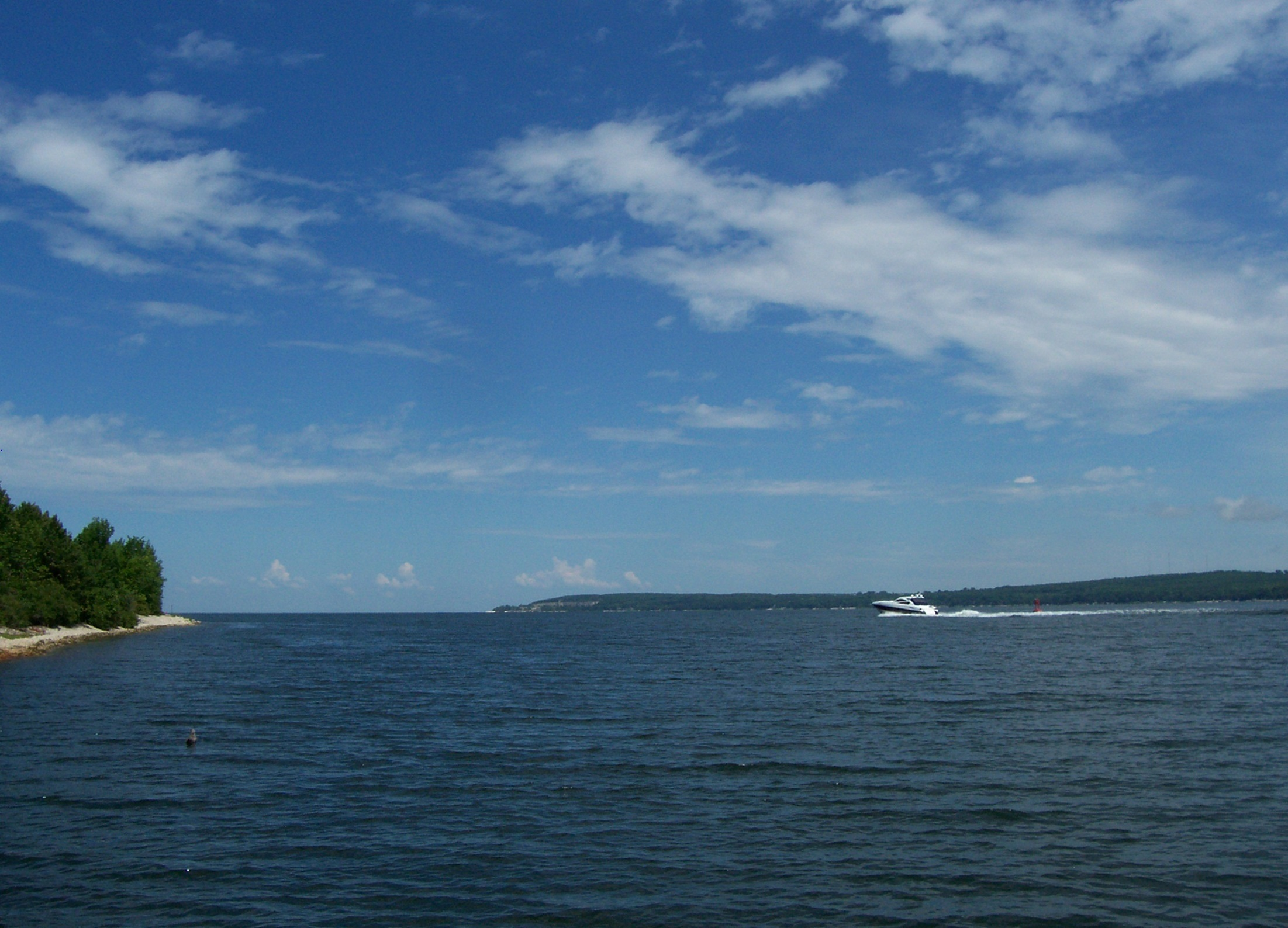
Looking northwest from beach at Sturgeon Bay

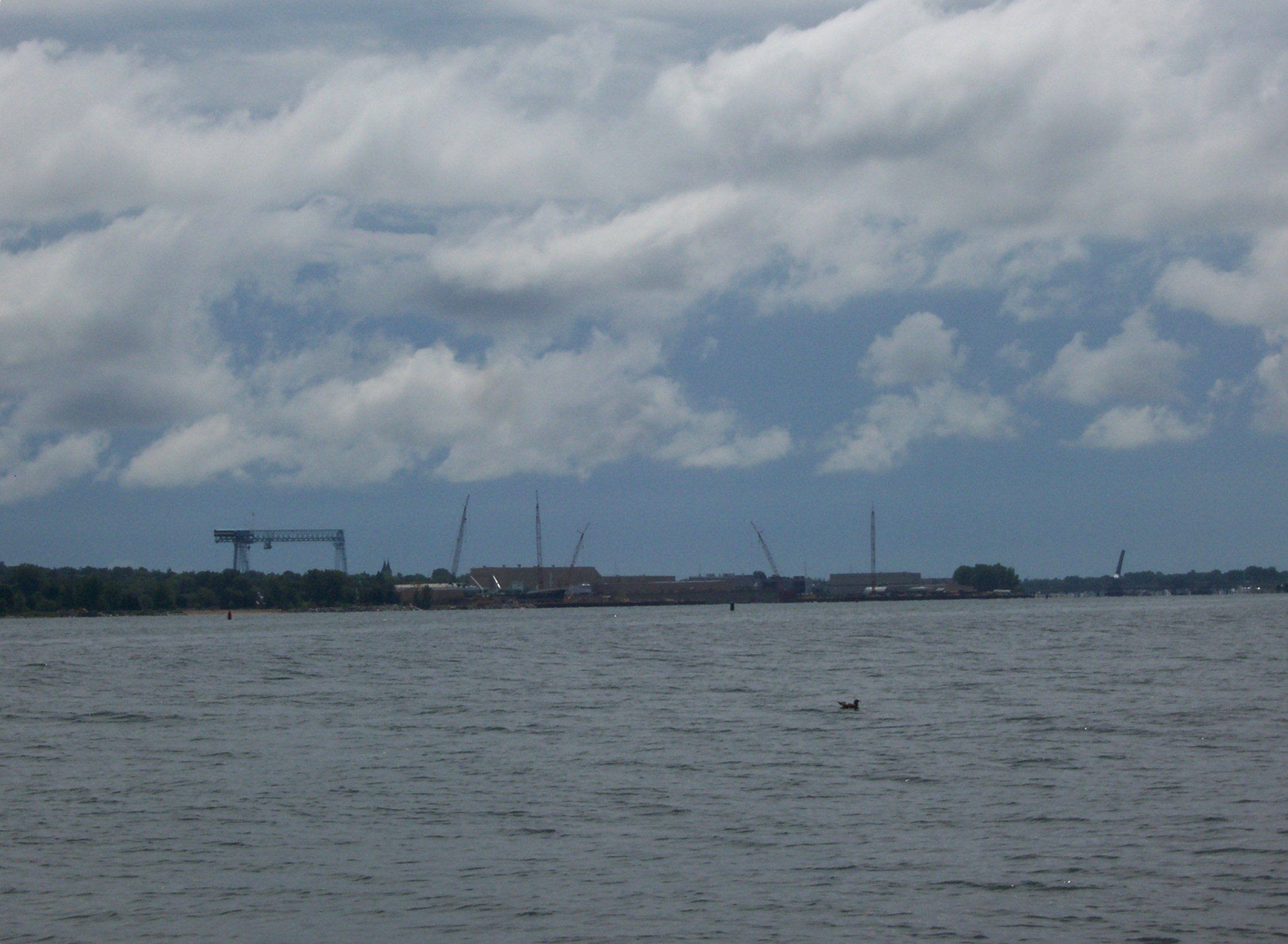
Looking southeast from beach at the city of Sturgeon Bay, Wisconsin

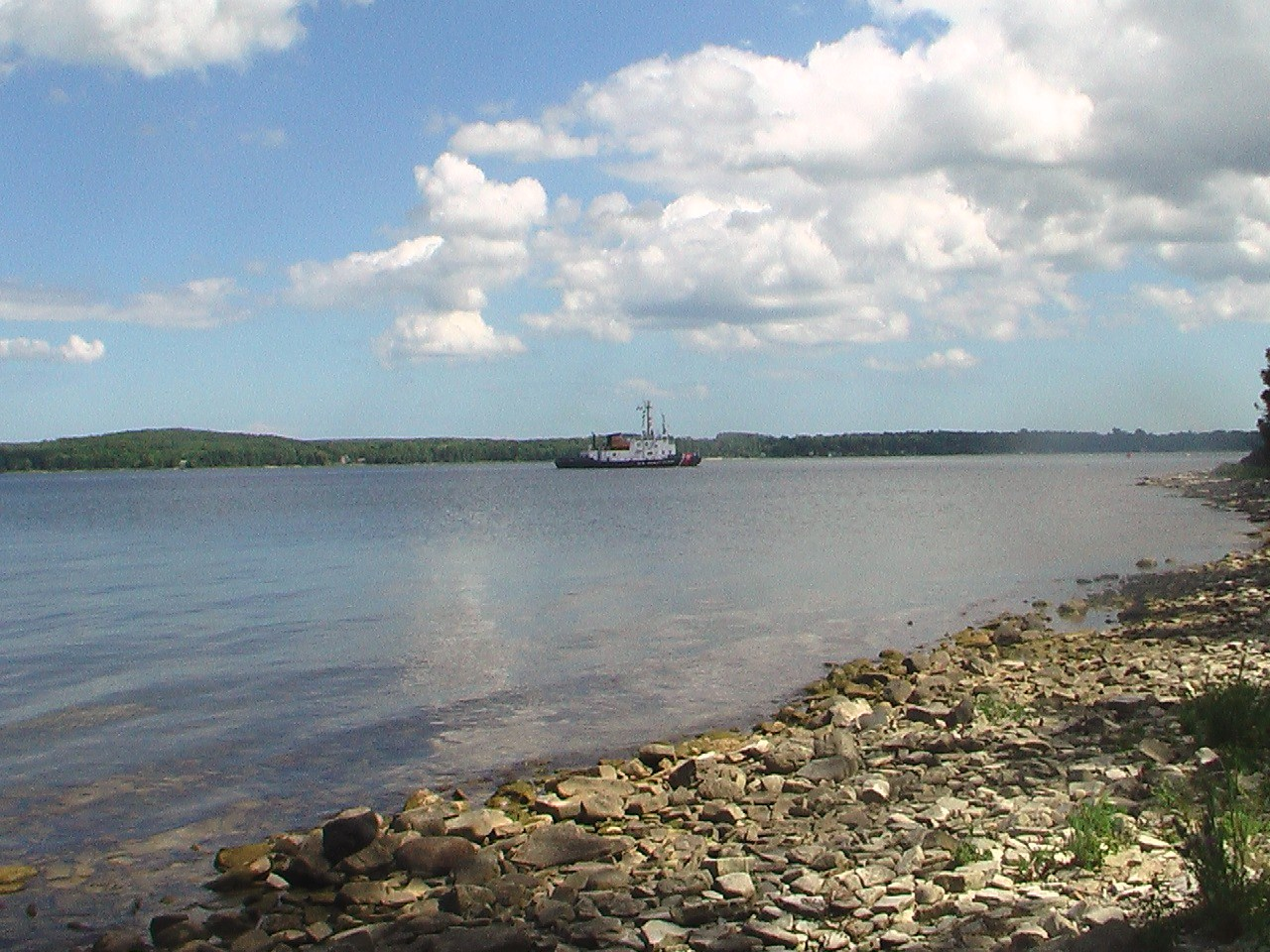
View from Tower Trail

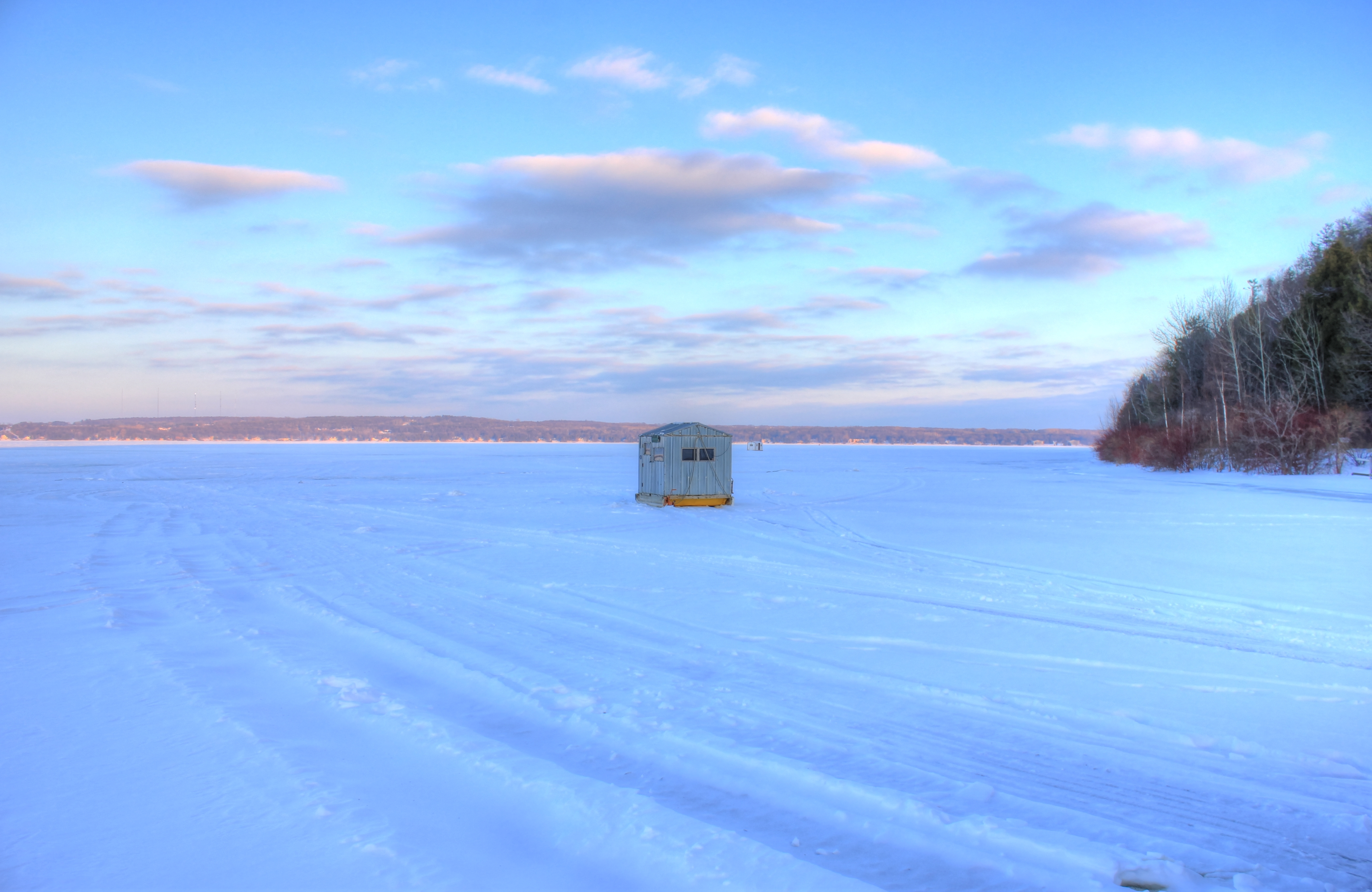
Ice fishing shack

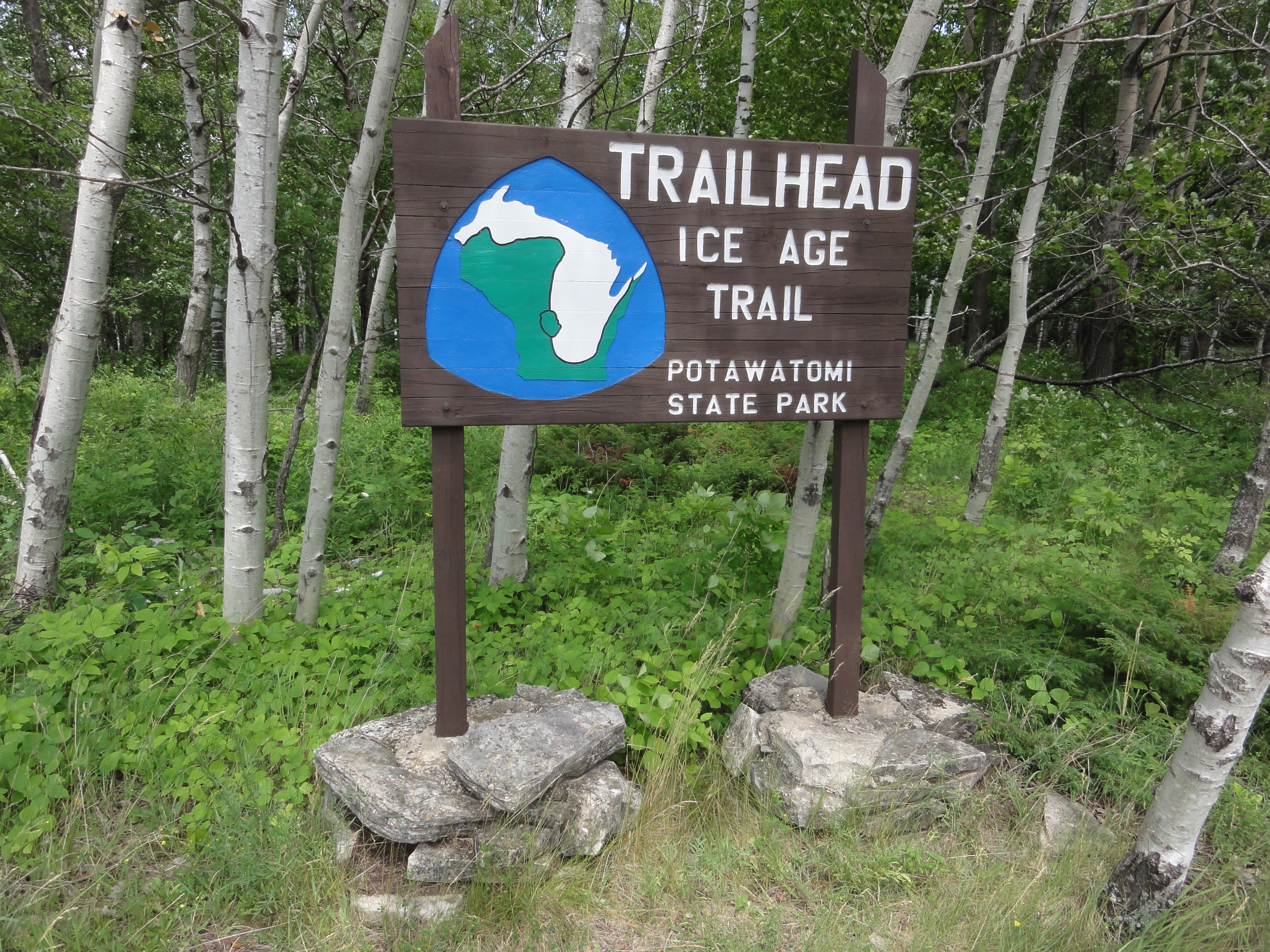
Trailhead

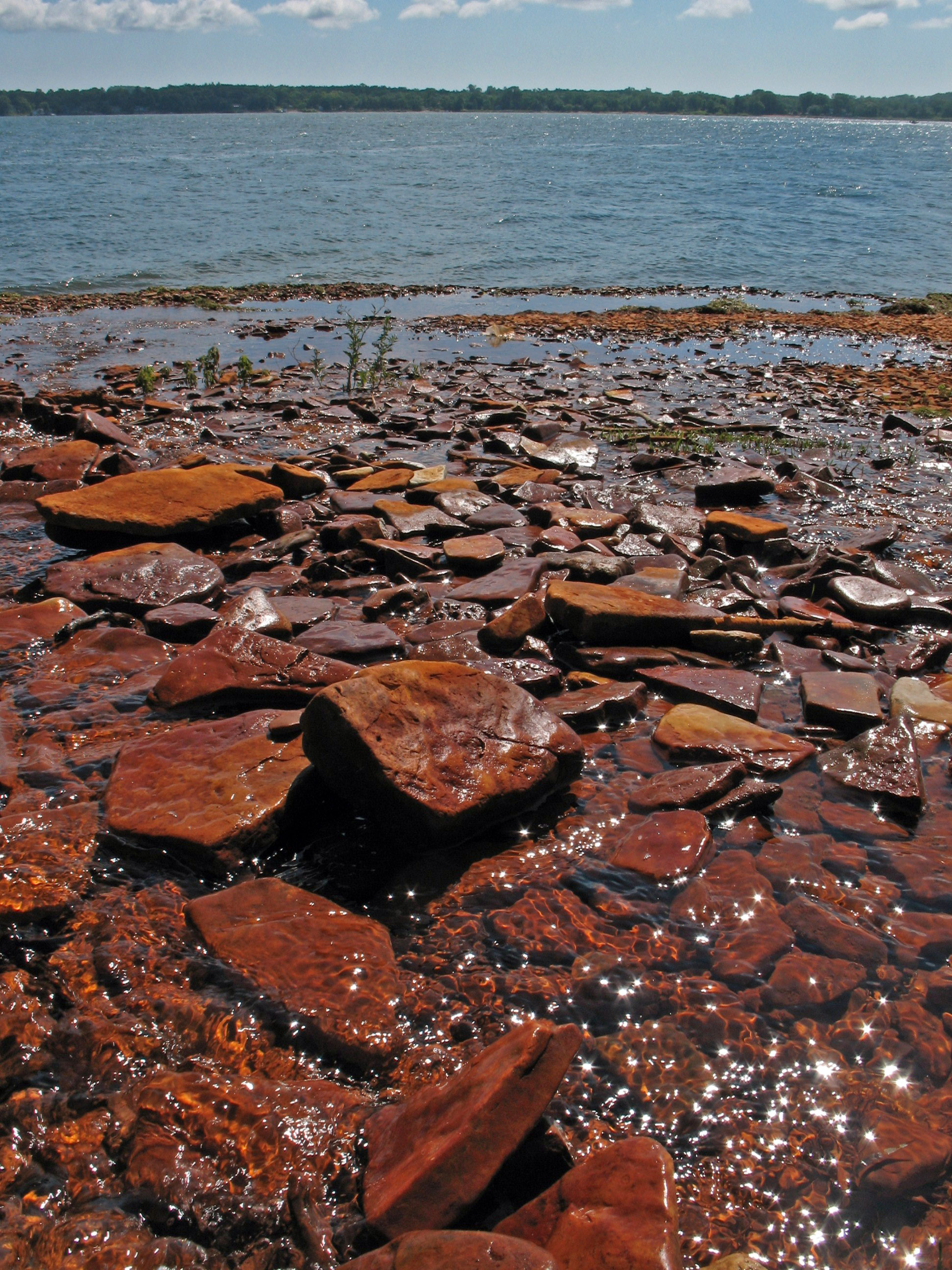
Shore

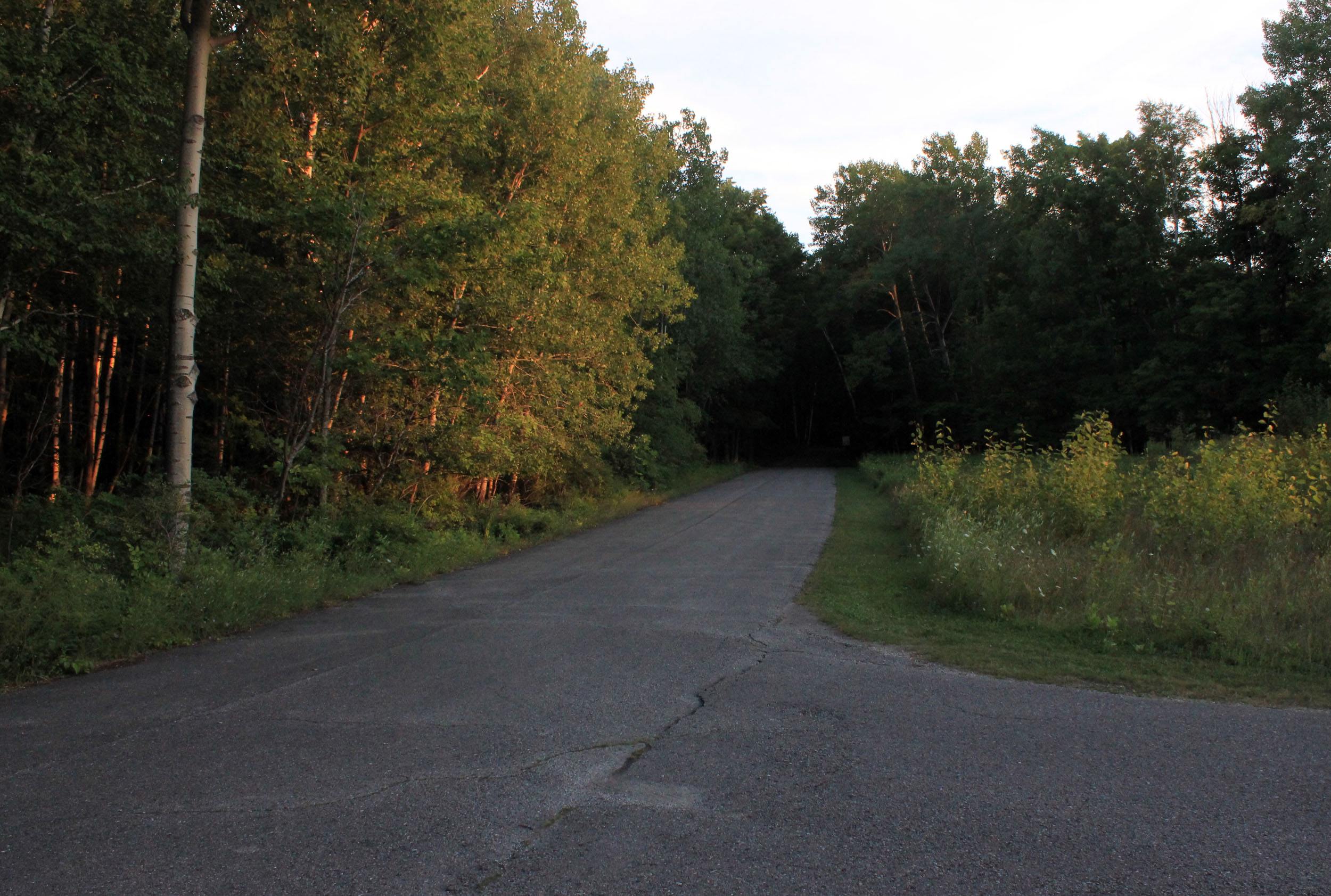
Road

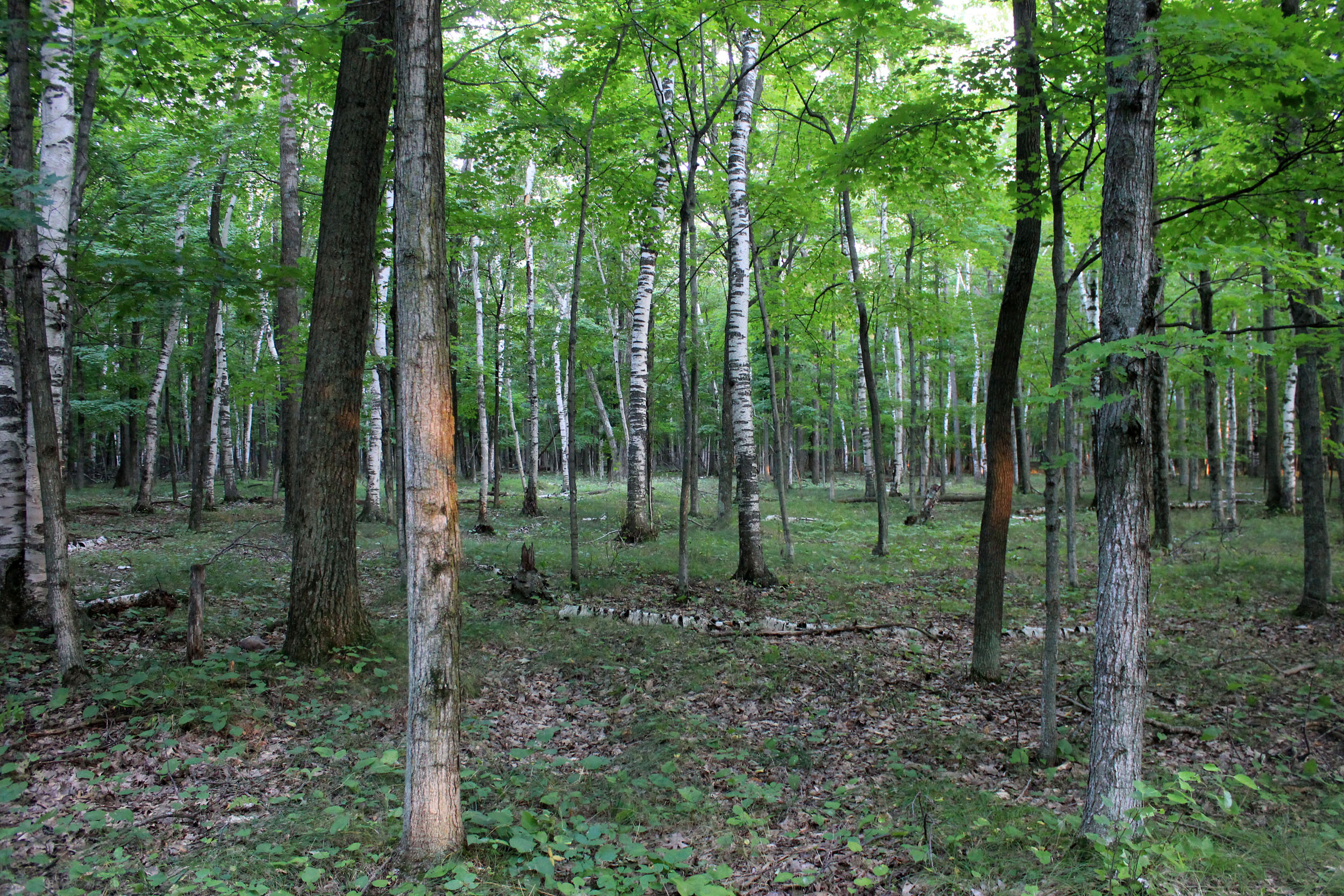
Forest

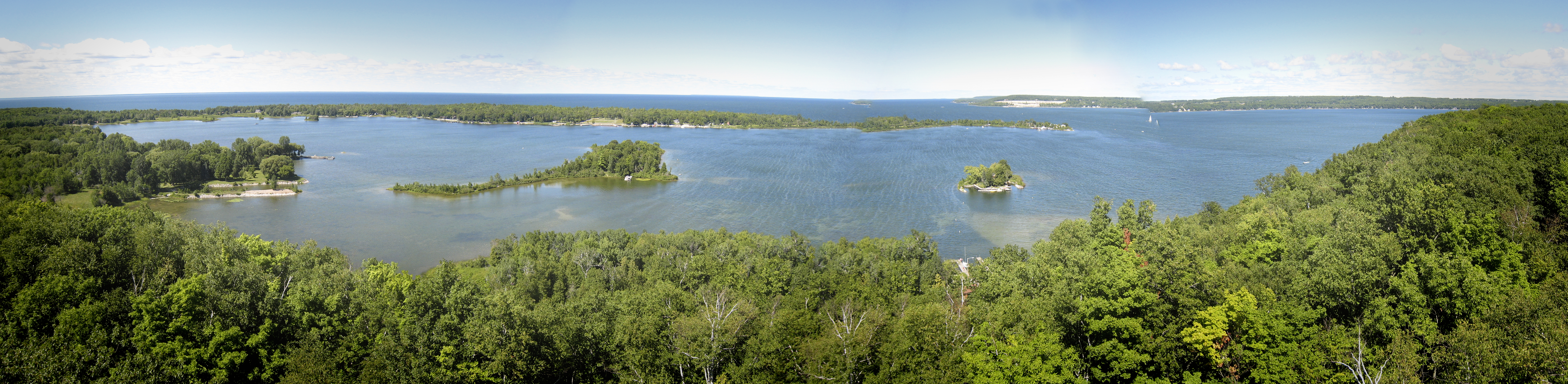
View in August from the now-closed tower. Sawyer Harbor is in the foreground, with the western part of Sturgeon Bay in the background. The small island at right is Heaven On Earth Island, formerly Bug Island. The larger island to the left is Idyll Wood Island. Cabot Point is behind the two islands. It is part of the Idlewild area. In the far distance at center-right is the rock cut of the Old Stone Quarry on the northwest shore of Sturgeon Bay, once the largest in the state.

== See also ==
- National Register of Historic Places listings in Door County, Wisconsin § Potawatomi State Park Observation Tower
