= Sturgeon Bay =

Arm of Green Bay within the Door Peninsula, Wisconsin

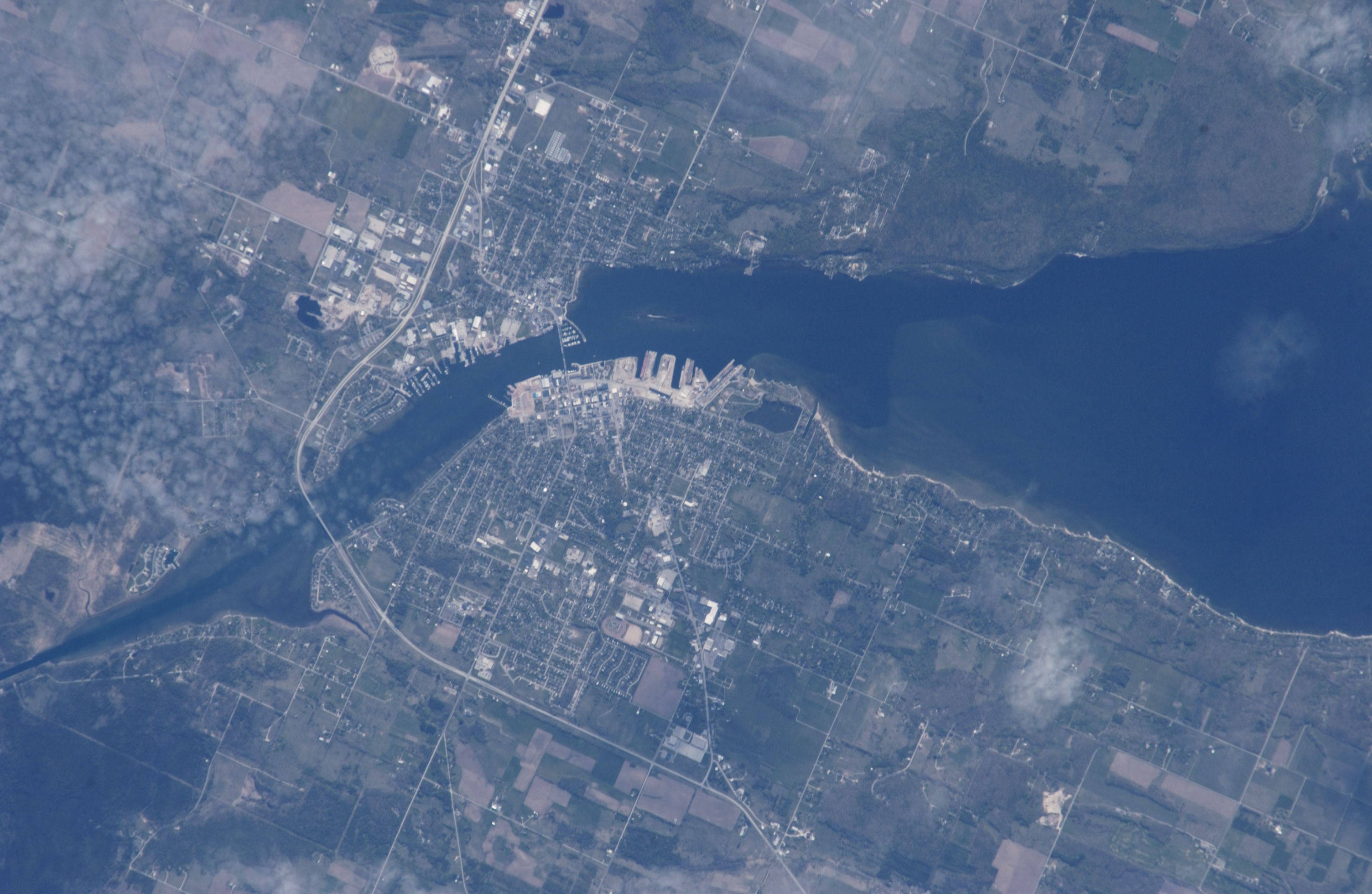
- Taken on May 16, 2005 from the International Space Station

- Location within Wisconsin Location within the United States
- Location: Door County, Wisconsin
- Coordinates: 44°51′15″N 87°23′40″W
- Type: Bay
- Surface elevation: 581 feet (177 m)
- Settlements: Sturgeon Bay, Nasewaupee, Sevastopol, Idlewild

Sturgeon Bay is an arm of Green Bay extending southeastward approximately 10 miles into the Door Peninsula at the city of Sturgeon Bay, located approximately halfway up the Door Peninsula. The bay is connected to Lake Michigan by the Sturgeon Bay Ship Canal. The Potawatomi name for Sturgeon Bay is "Na-ma-we-qui-tong".

== Origin ==
The bay seems to represent the pre-glacial path of the Menominee River, with the valley deepened by glacial carving and then submerged into rising lakewaters.

== Bridges ==
Three bridges cross the bay, including the historic Sturgeon Bay Bridge, and the recently finished Oregon Street Bridge.

== Fish ==
Sturgeon Bay and Little Sturgeon (just to the south of Sturgeon Bay) are considered biodiversity hotspots because they support a large number of different fish species.

Researchers collected viral hemorrhagic septicemia viruses from 184 different fish from 2003 to 2017. Two were found from 2007 to 2010 infecting smallmouth bass within Sturgeon Bay. Each of them was a different variant of a type not found in the middle or lower Great Lakes.

== Mayflies ==
In June 2016, an estimated several thousand mayflies hatched in Sawyer Bay (within Sturgeon Bay). This was the result of an experiment to stock millions of eggs from the species Hexagenia limbata and Hexagenia bilineata in the lower Green Bay area in an attempt to reintroduce the species. The last mayfly from the genus Hexagenia had been collected in the lower Green Bay area in 1955. As mayfly populations can be unstable and not all stocking locations appeared to be successful, as of 2017 it was not yet known whether it would be possible for populations of Hexagenia mayflies to become self-sustaining.

== Climate ==
Dunlap Reef (in the middle of the bay)

Climate chart (precipitation, max. and min. temperature)
J	F	M	A	M	J	J	A	S	O	N	D
57 −6 −8	54 −8 −15	60 1 −4	129 9 −2	93 13 3	85 18 9	97 21 12	78 20 15	87 19 12	129 11 3	85 7 1	65 −2 −2
- █ Average max. and min. temperatures in °C
- █ Precipitation totals in mm
Imperial conversion
J	F	M	A	M	J	J	A	S	O	N	D
2.2 21 18	2.1 18 5	2.4 34 25	5.1 48 28	3.7 55 37	3.3 64 48	3.8 70 54	3.1 68 59	3.4 66 54	5.1 52 37	3.3 45 34	2.6 28 28
- █ Average max. and min. temperatures in °F
- █ Precipitation totals in inches

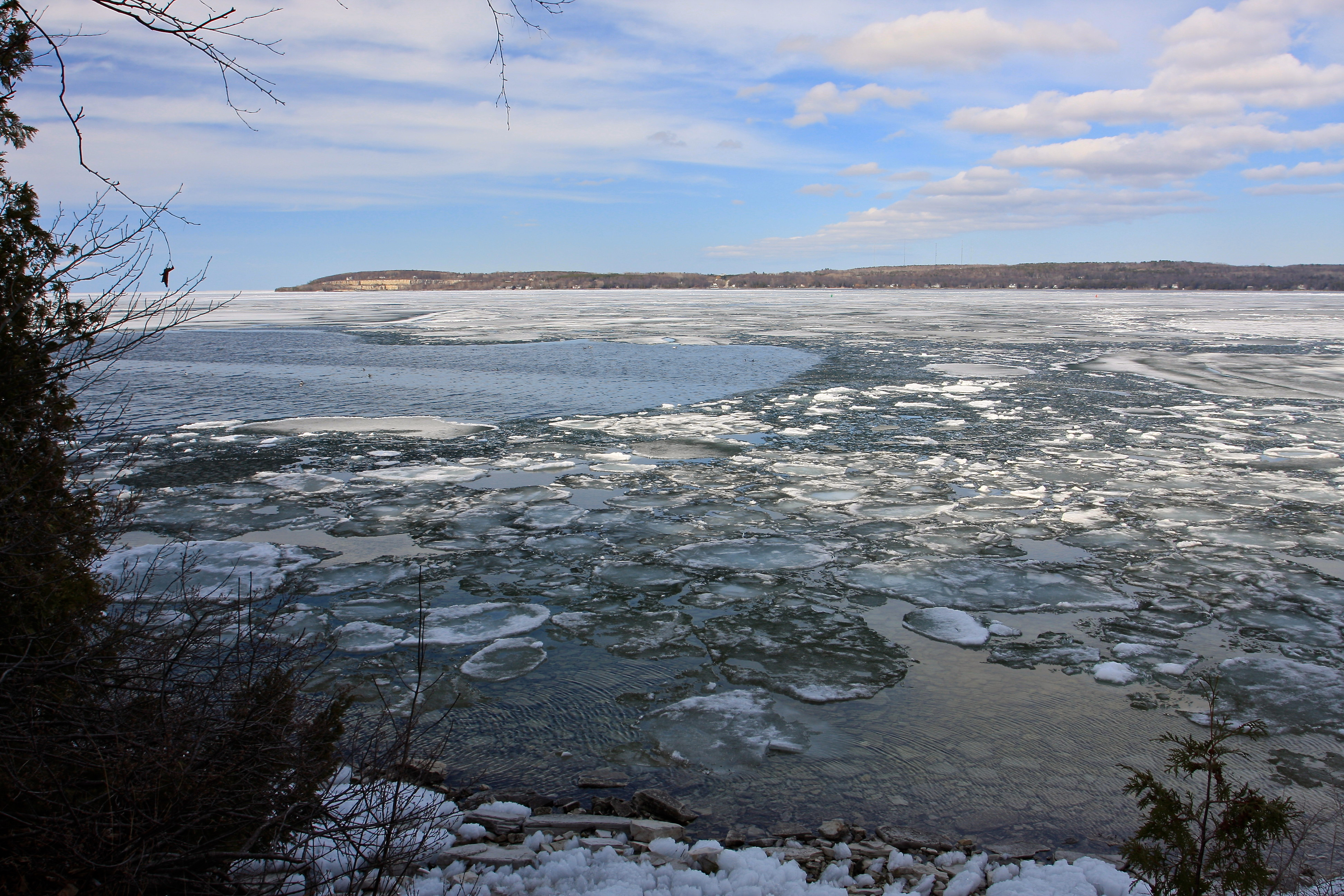
Mixture of ice and open water in the bay, April

== Gallery ==
Flyover of Sturgeon Bay

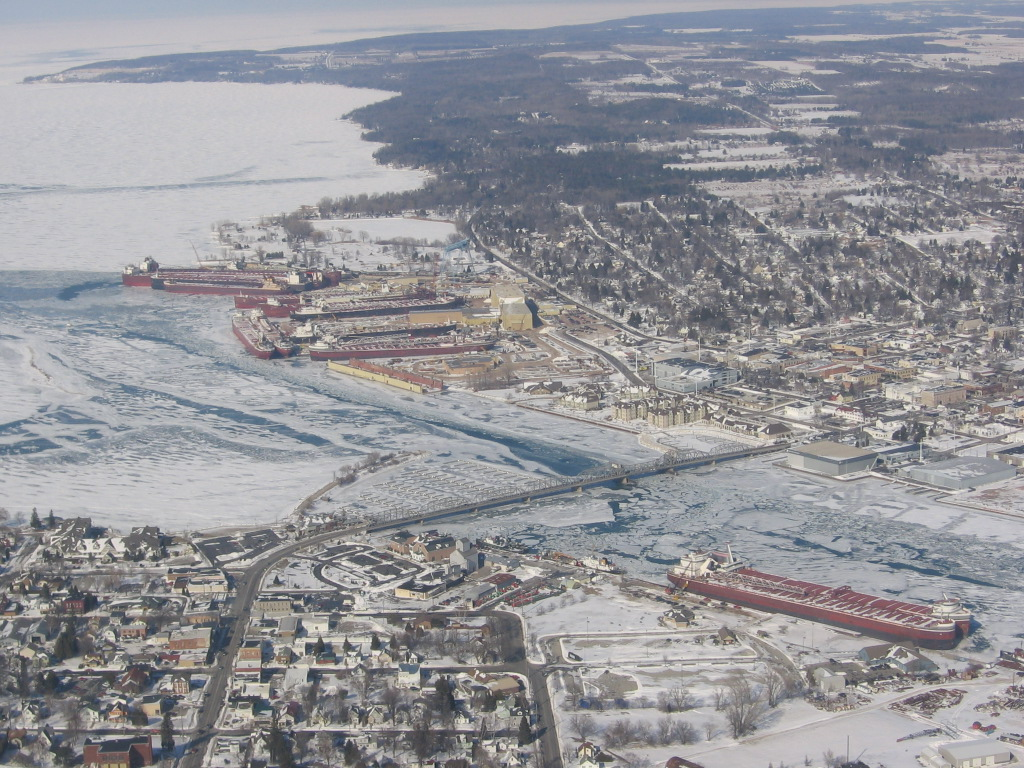
Aerial view of Sturgeon Bay

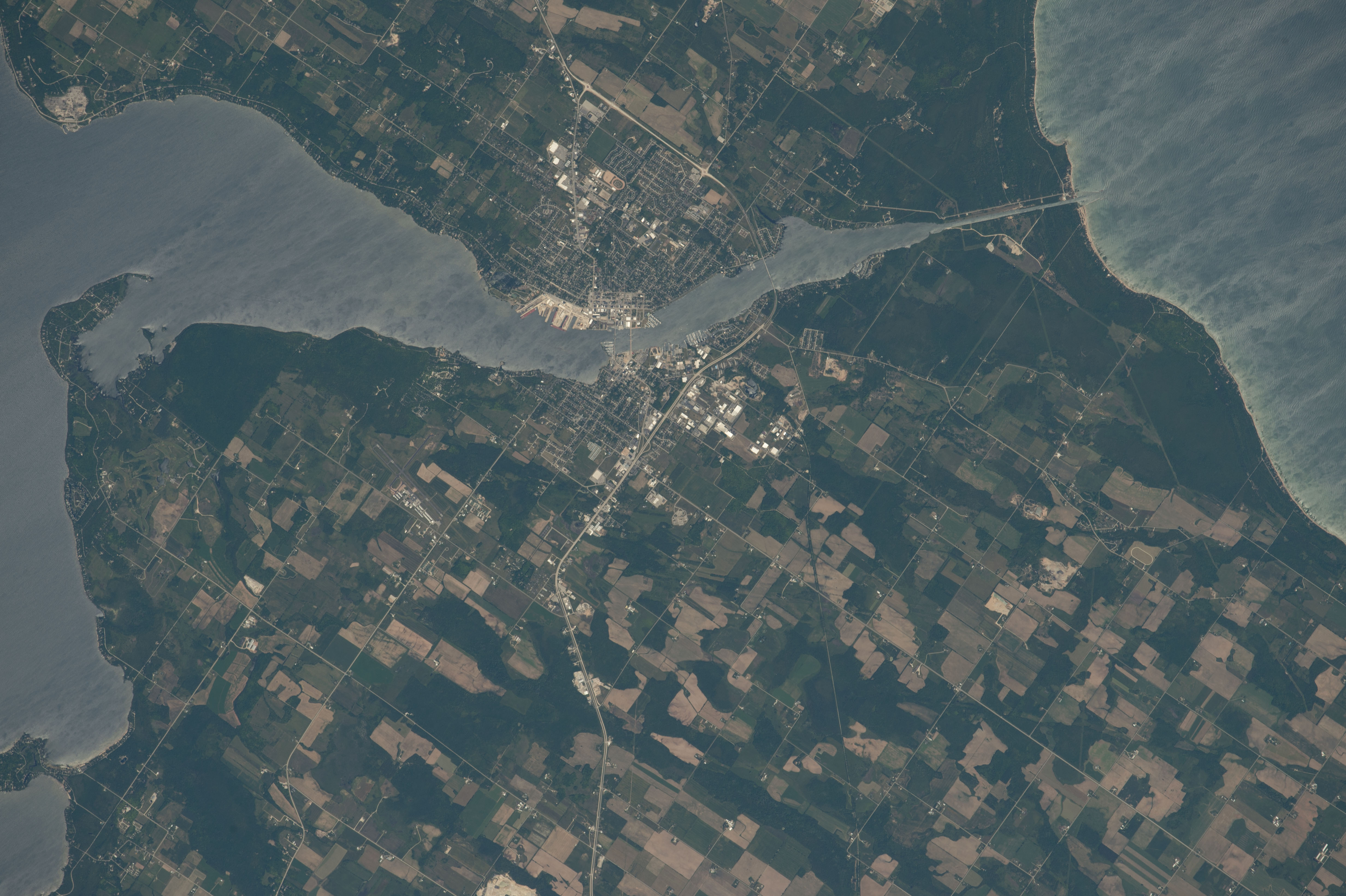
Taken June 20, 2016 from the International Space Station

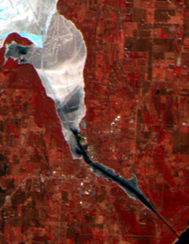
Taken March 20, 2022 with Resourcesat-2; the path made by the icebreaker extends into the canal.

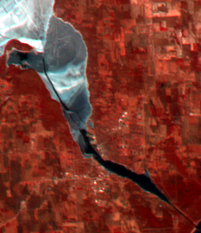
Taken March 28, 2022 with Resourcesat-2

Outer portion of the bay

Further into the bay

Inner portion of the bay

End of the bay and the connection with the Sturgeon Bay Ship Canal

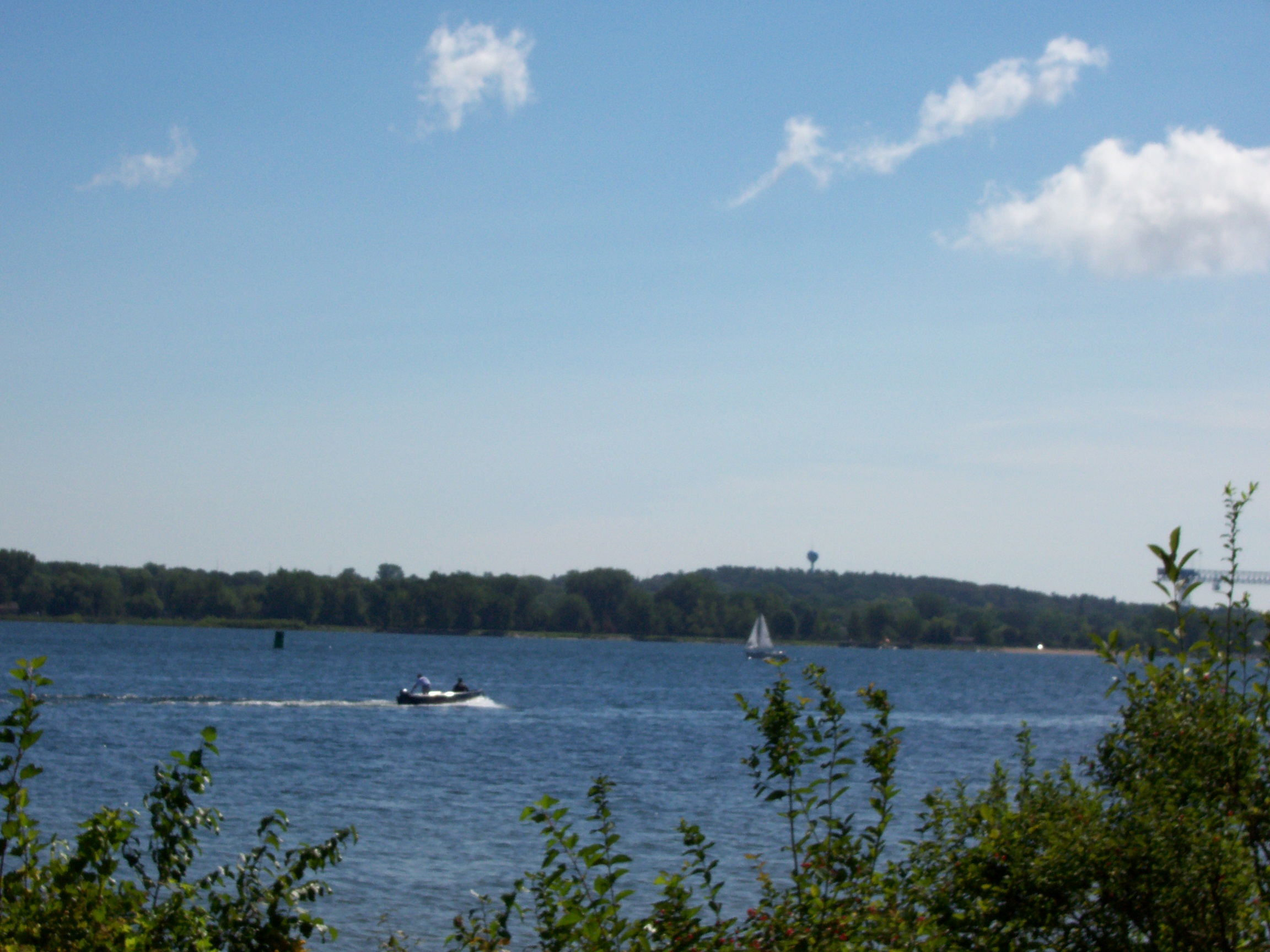
Looking southeast across Sturgeon Bay from Potawatomi State Park

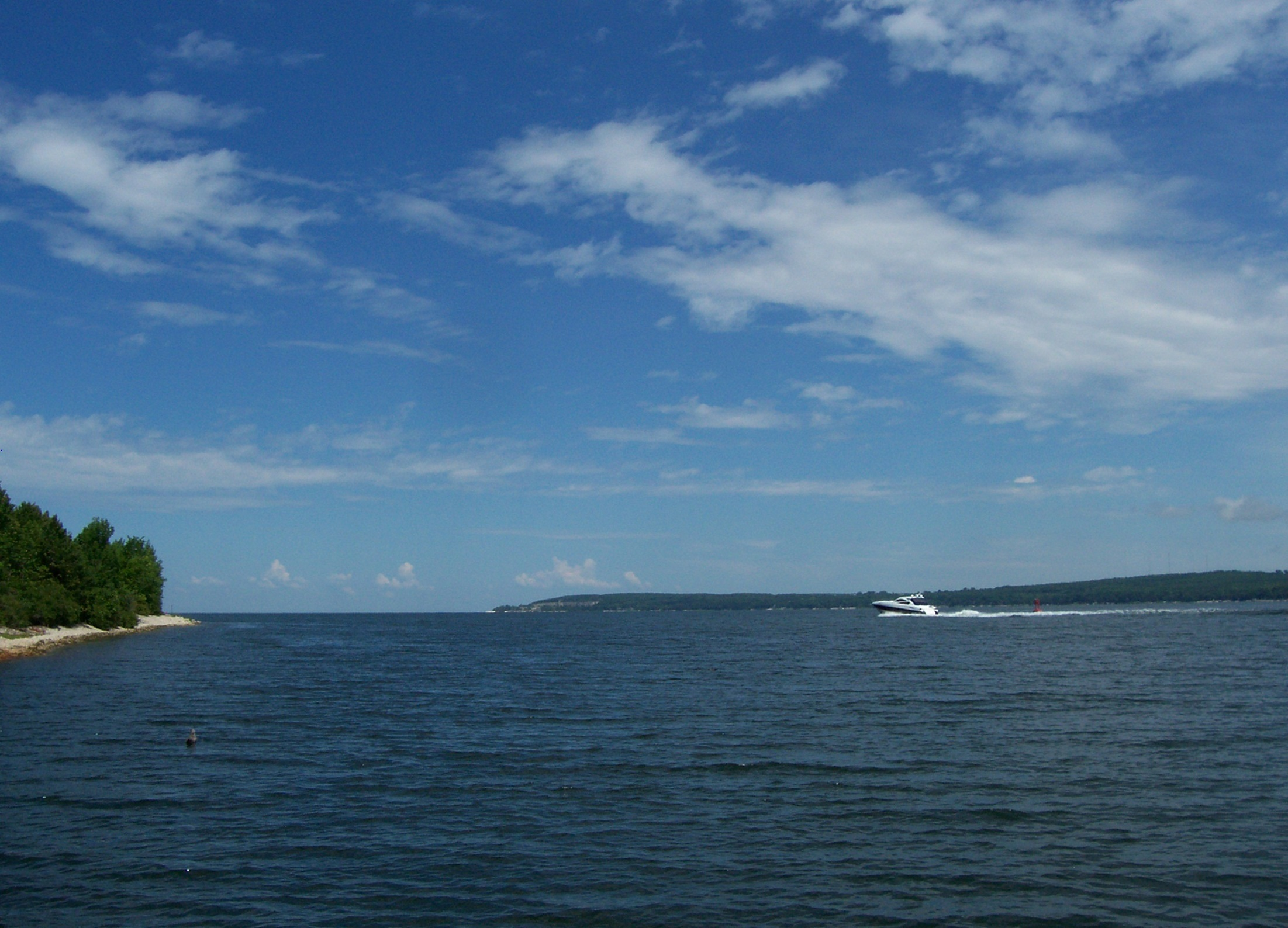
Looking northeast at the mouth of Sturgeon Bay from Potawatomi State Park

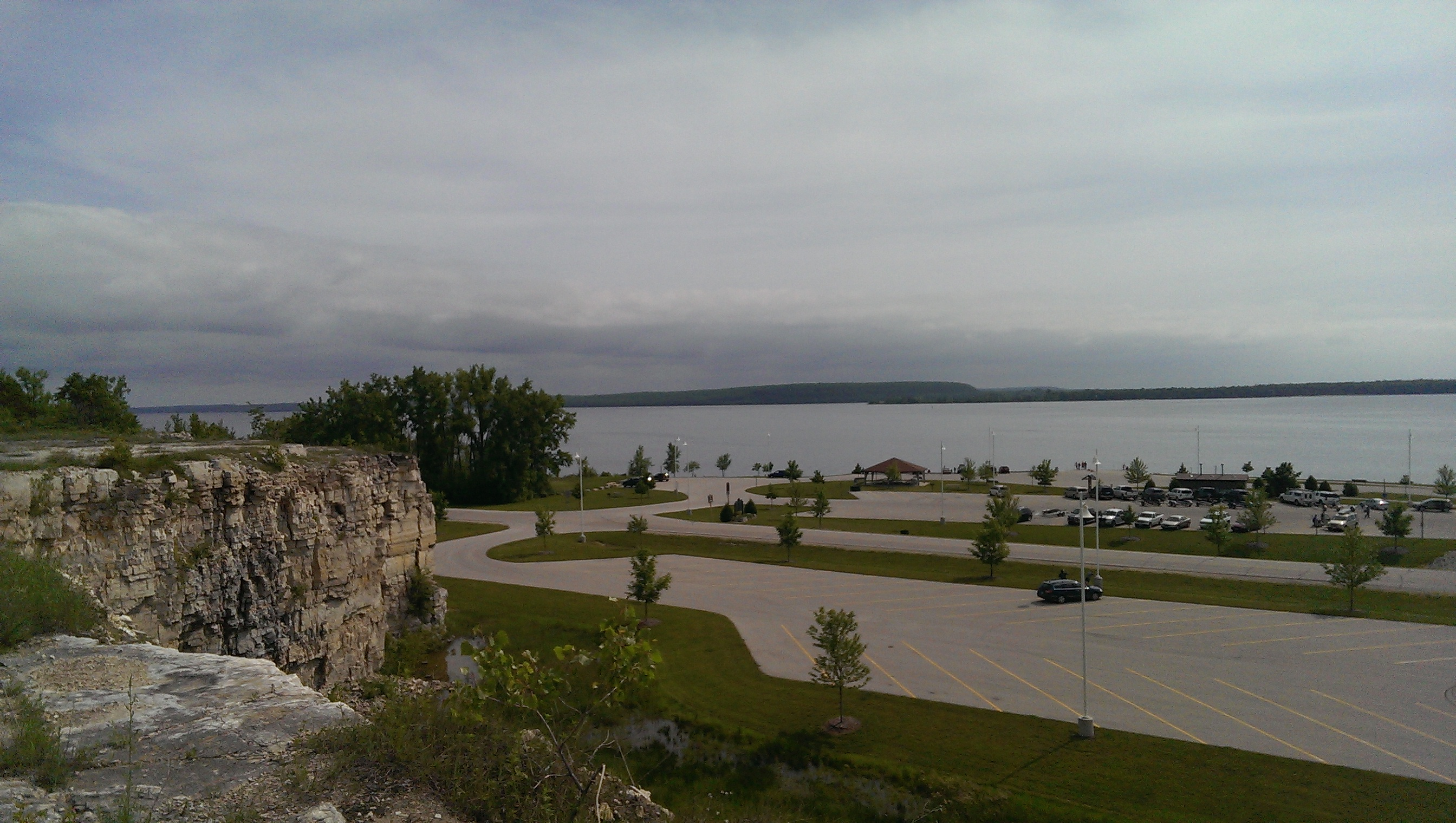
View to the southwest across Sturgeon Bay to Cabot Point in the Idlewild area (background, right) and the bluff at Potawatomi State Park (background, center) from the Old Stone Quarry in Sevastopol; much of the quarry is now George K. Pinney County Park
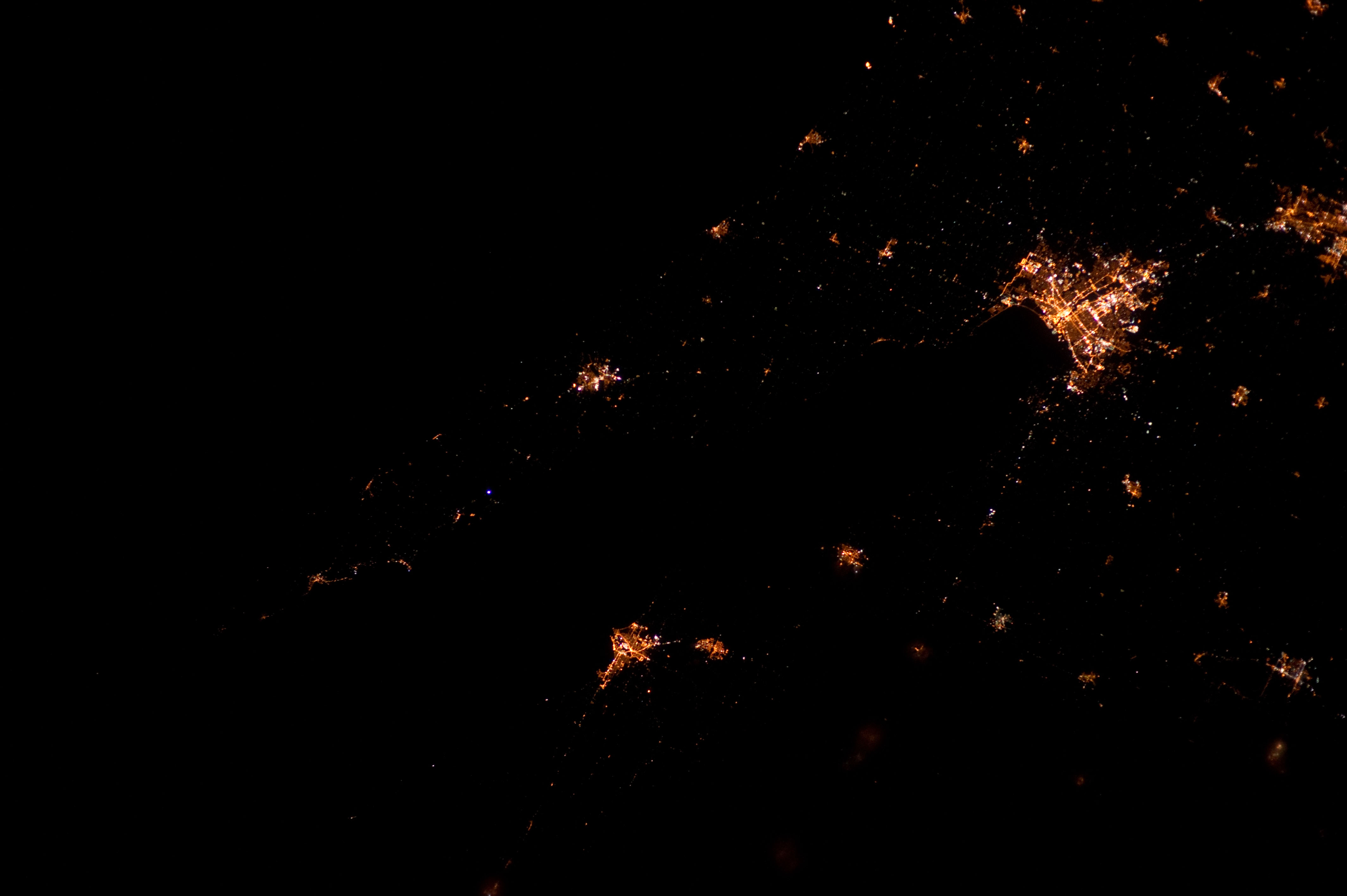
Sturgeon Bay, 1:10 AM CDT
