= Sherwood Point Light =

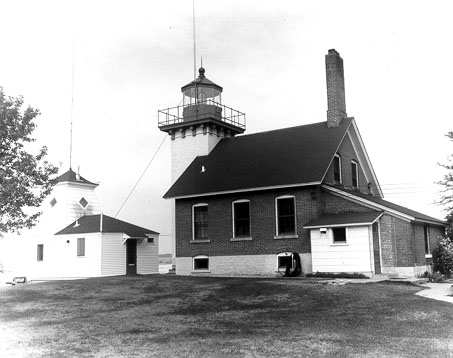
- Location: Idlewild, Wisconsin
- Coordinates: 44°53′34″N 87°26′0.36″W

Tower
- Foundation: Concrete
- Construction: Brick
- Automated: 1983
- Height: 37 feet (11 m)
- Shape: Square
- Heritage: National Register of Historic Places listed place

Light
- First lit: 1883
- Focal height: 18.5 m (61 ft)
- Lens: Fifth order Fresnel lens
- Range: 15 nautical miles (28 km; 17 mi)
- Characteristic: White, Isophase 6 s
- Sherwood Point Light Station
- U.S. National Register of Historic Places
- Area: 4 acres (1.6 ha)
- Built: 1883
- MPS: U.S. Coast Guard Lighthouses and Light Stations on the Great Lakes TR (Archived October 17, 2012)
- NRHP reference No.: 84003663
- Added to NRHP: July 19, 1984

The Sherwood Point lighthouse is a lighthouse located near Idlewild in Door County, Wisconsin, United States.

Situated on the west side of the north entrance to Sturgeon Bay, it was listed in the National Register of Historic Places in 1984.

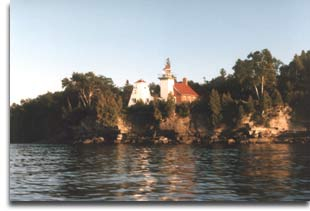

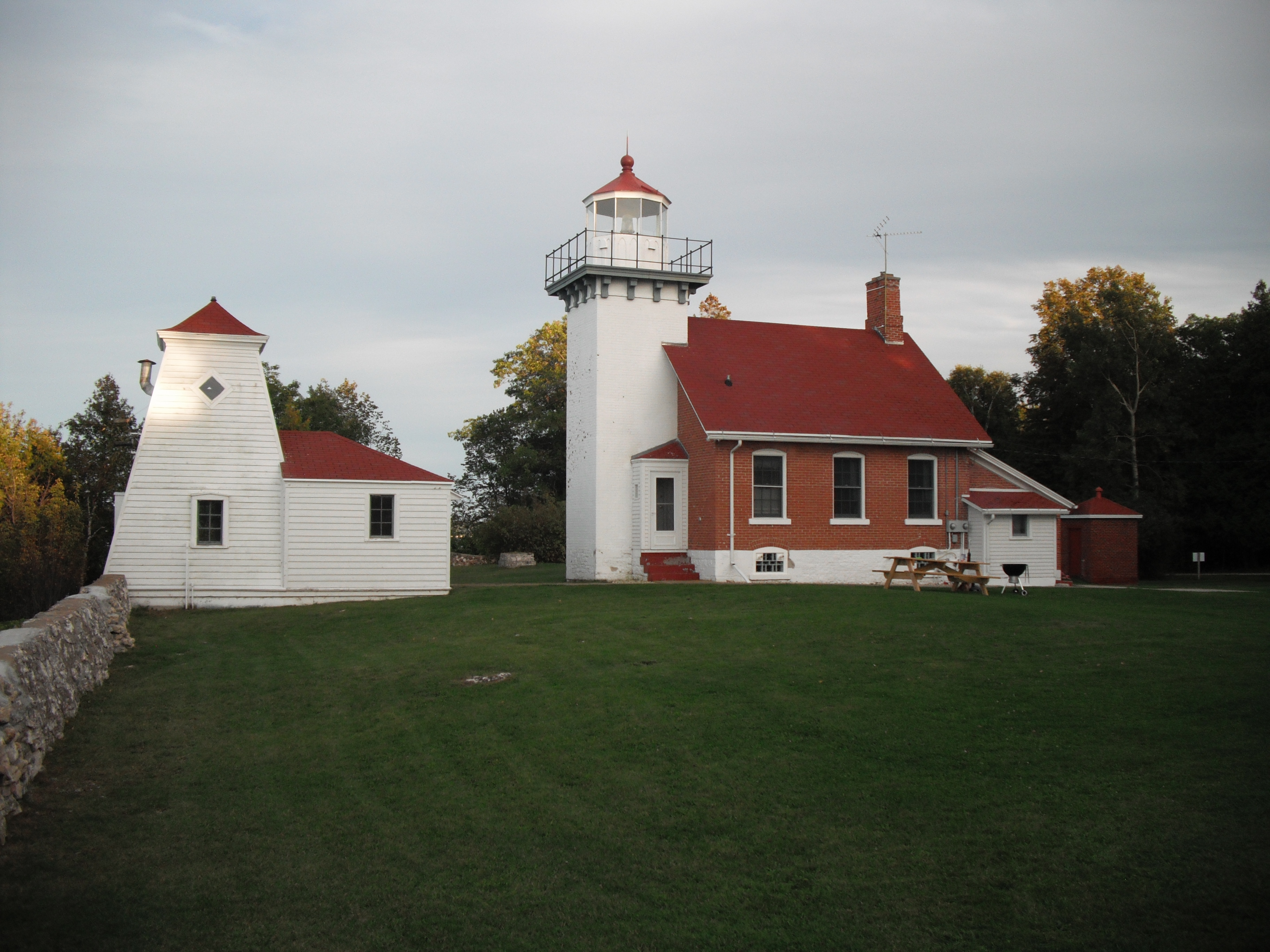

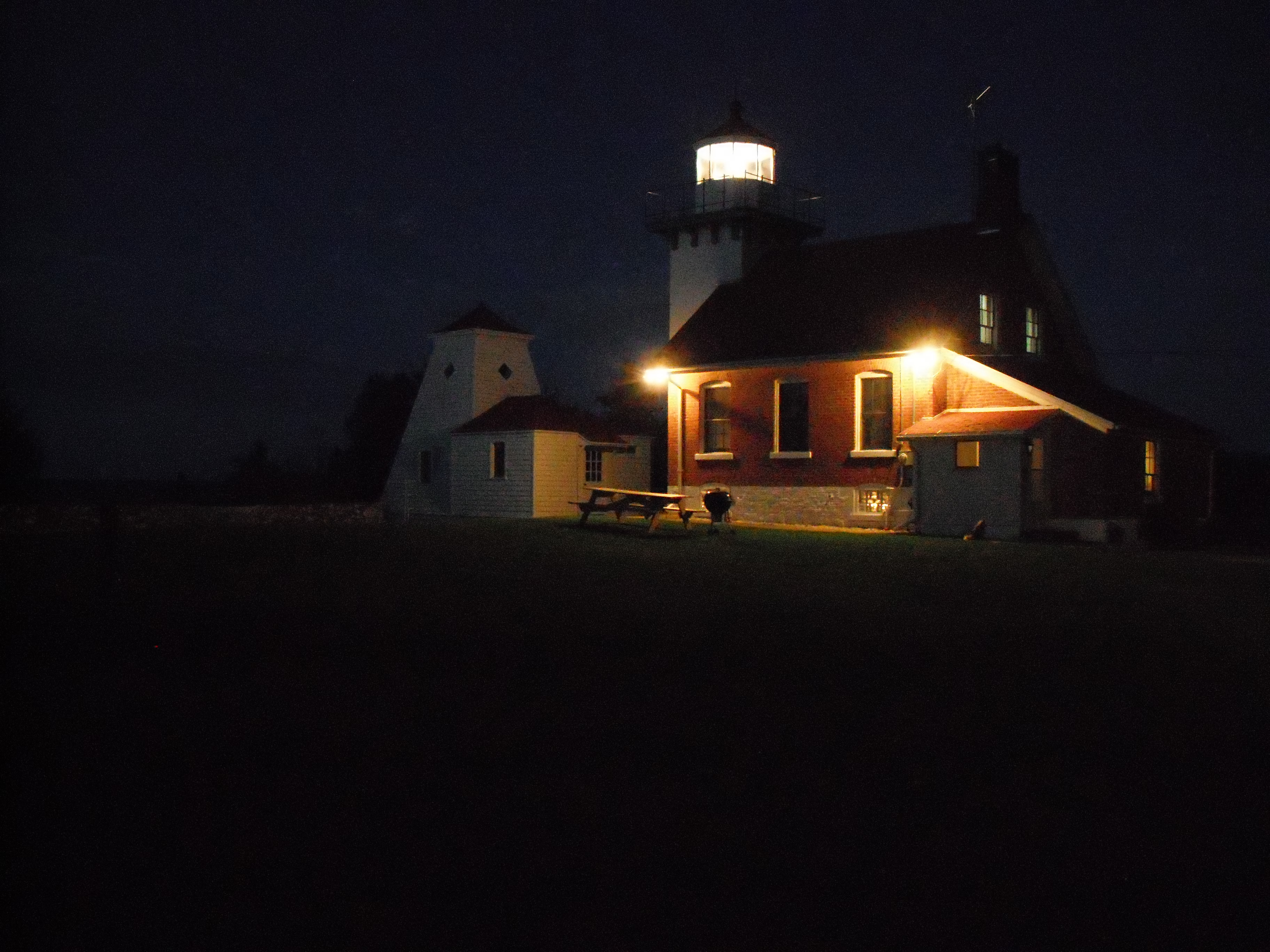
