= Nasewaupee, Wisconsin =

- Town
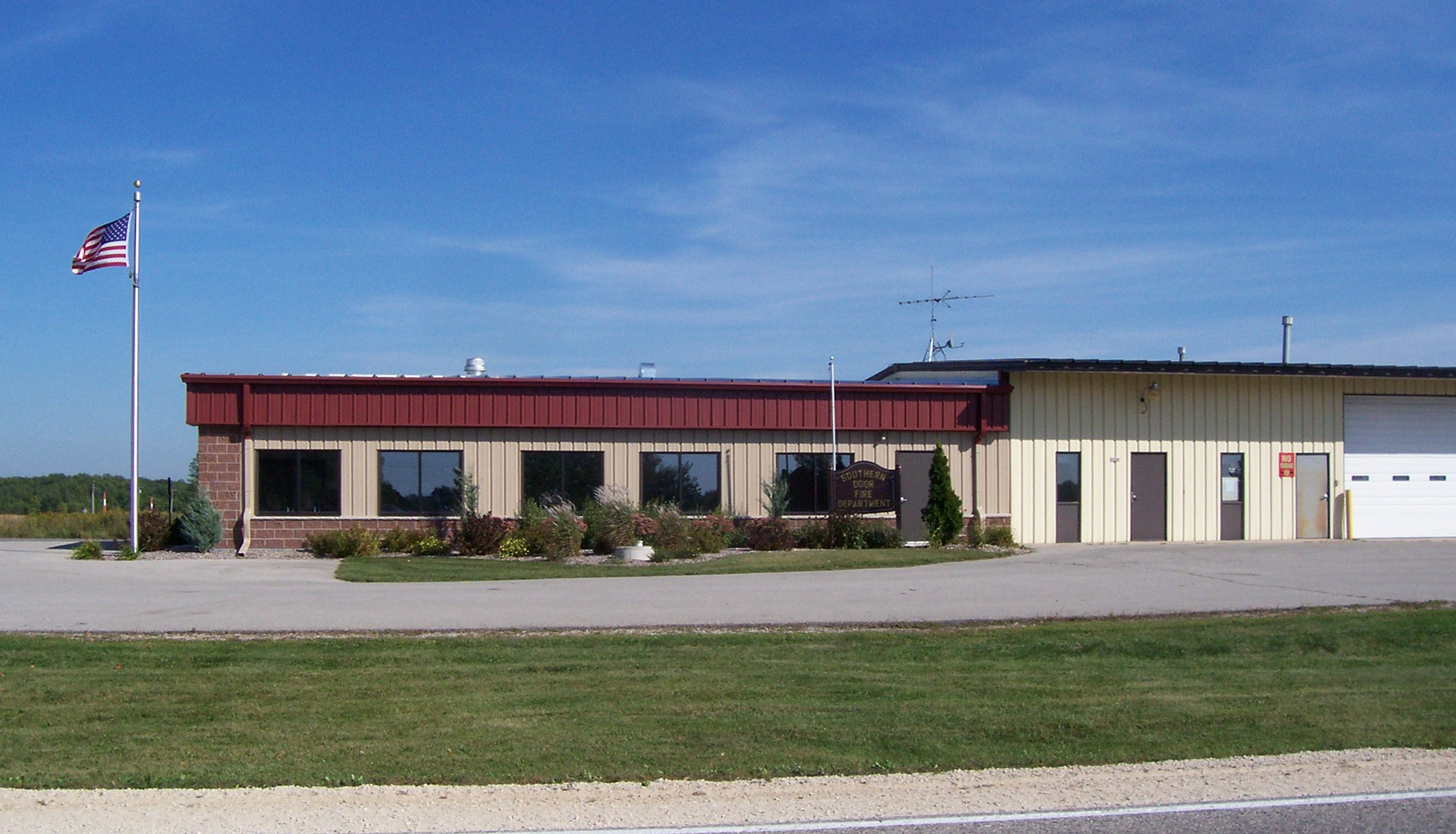
- Town hall

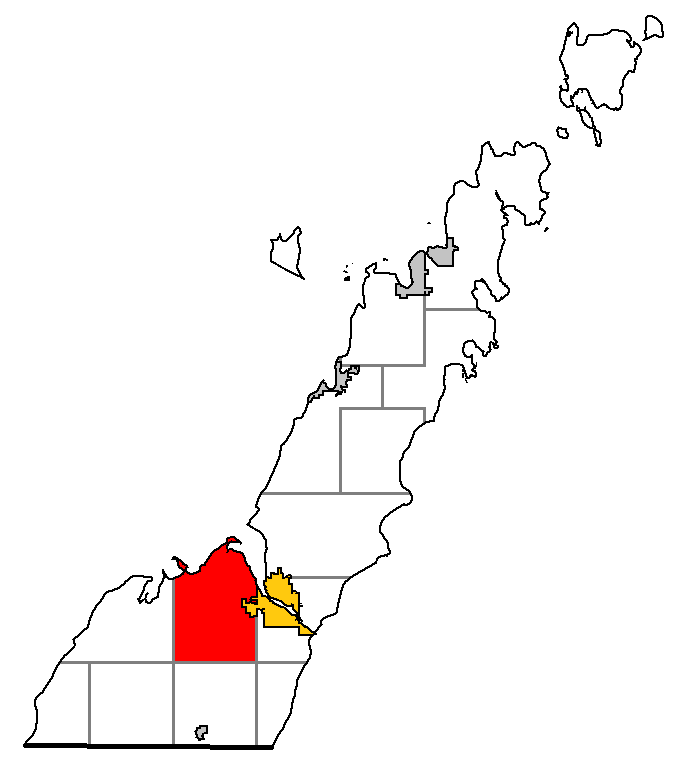
- Location of Nasewaupee, within Door County Map
- Coordinates: 44°50′57″N 87°27′37″W
- Country: United States
- State: Wisconsin
- County: Door

Area
  - Total: 71.1 sq mi (184.2 km^{2})
  - Land: 43.1 sq mi (111.5 km^{2})
  - Water: 28.1 sq mi (72.7 km^{2})
- Elevation: 620 ft (189 m)

Population (2020)
  - Total: 1,984
  - Density: 46.09/sq mi (17.79/km^{2})
- Time zone: UTC-6 (Central (CST))
  - Summer (DST): UTC-5 (CDT)
- Area code: 920
- FIPS code: 55-55500
- GNIS feature ID: 1583778
- Website: https://townofnasewaupeewi.gov/

Nasewaupee (/ˌnæsəˈwɔːpi/ NASS-ə-WAW-pee) is a town in Door County, Wisconsin, United States. The population was 1,984 at the 2020 census. The unincorporated community of Idlewild is located in the town, as is Sherwood Point Light and Potawatomi State Park.

== History ==
The town was formed in 1859 and was named after a Menominee chief who lived there, though the Menominee word "Nasewaupee" itself refers to early dawn, or the time before sunrise.

== Geography ==
According to the United States Census Bureau, the town has a total area of 71.1 square miles (184.2 km^{2}), of which 43.1 square miles (111.6 km^{2}) is land and 28.1 square miles (72.7 km^{2}) (39.45%) is water.

== Transportation ==
- Ice Age Trail in Potawatomi state park
- Wisconsin Highway 42

== Demographics ==
As of the census of 2000, there were 1,873 people, 778 households, and 581 families residing in the town. The population density was 43.5 people per square mile (16.8/km^{2}). There were 1,320 housing units at an average density of 30.6 per square mile (11.8/km^{2}). The racial makeup of the town was 97.49% White, 1.28% Native American, 0.21% Asian, 0.05% Pacific Islander, 0.16% from other races, and 0.80% from two or more races. 0.53% of the population were Hispanic or Latino of any race were 0.53% of the population.

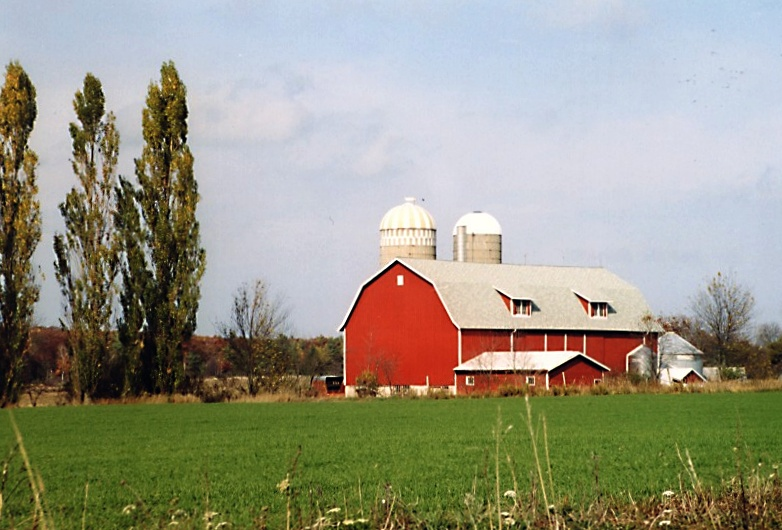
Typical farm in Door County

There were 778 households, out of which 28.0% had children under the age of 18 living with them, 66.2% were married couples living together, 4.8% had a female householder with no husband present, and 25.2% were non-families. 21.6% of all households were made up of individuals, and 9.5% had someone living alone who was 65 years of age or older. The average household size was 2.41 and the average family size was 2.78.

In the town, the population was spread out, with 21.0% under the age of 18, 6.0% from 18 to 24, 26.8% from 25 to 44, 29.8% from 45 to 64, and 16.4% who were 65 years of age or older. The median age was 43 years. For every 100 females, there were 105.8 males. For every 100 females age 18 and over, there were 100.8 males.

The median income for a household in the town was $43,292, and the median income for a family was $50,900. Males had a median income of $33,917 versus $21,935 for females. The per capita income for the town was $20,815. About 2.4% of families and 3.4% of the population were below the poverty line, including 3.3% of those under the age of 18 and 4.5% of those 65 and older.

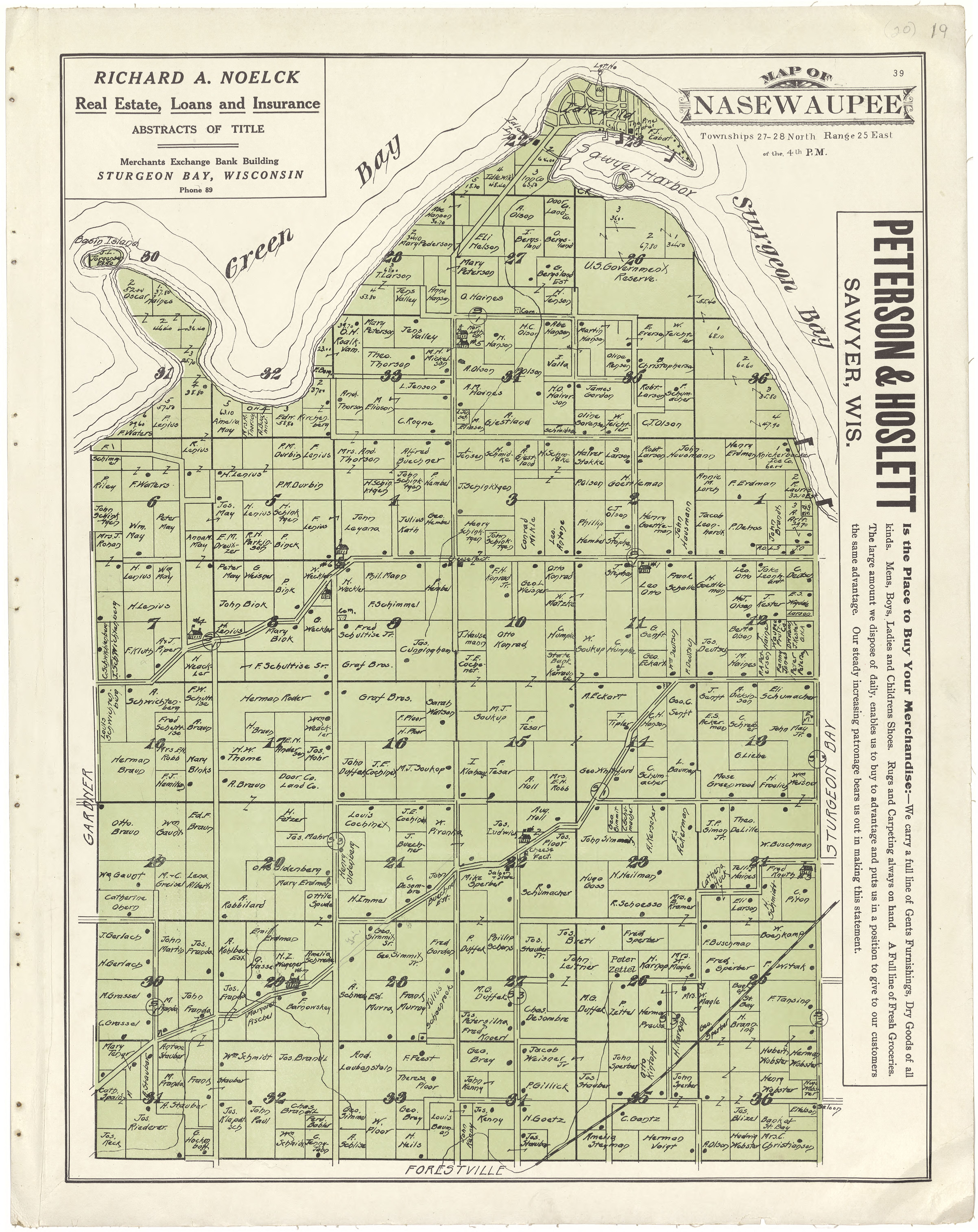
1914 plat map of Nasewaupee

== Climate ==
Greenwood Swamp (within the town)

Climate chart (precipitation, max. and min. temperature)
J	F	M	A	M	J	J	A	S	O	N	D
57 −6 −8	54 −8 −15	60 1 −4	129 9 −2	93 13 3	85 18 9	97 21 12	78 20 15	87 19 12	129 11 3	85 7 1	65 −2 −2
- █ Average max. and min. temperatures in °C
- █ Precipitation totals in mm
Imperial conversion
J	F	M	A	M	J	J	A	S	O	N	D
2.2 21 18	2.1 18 5	2.4 34 25	5.1 48 28	3.7 55 37	3.3 64 48	3.8 70 54	3.1 68 59	3.4 66 54	5.1 52 37	3.3 45 34	2.6 28 28
- █ Average max. and min. temperatures in °F
- █ Precipitation totals in inches
