= Idlewild, Wisconsin =

- Unincorporated community
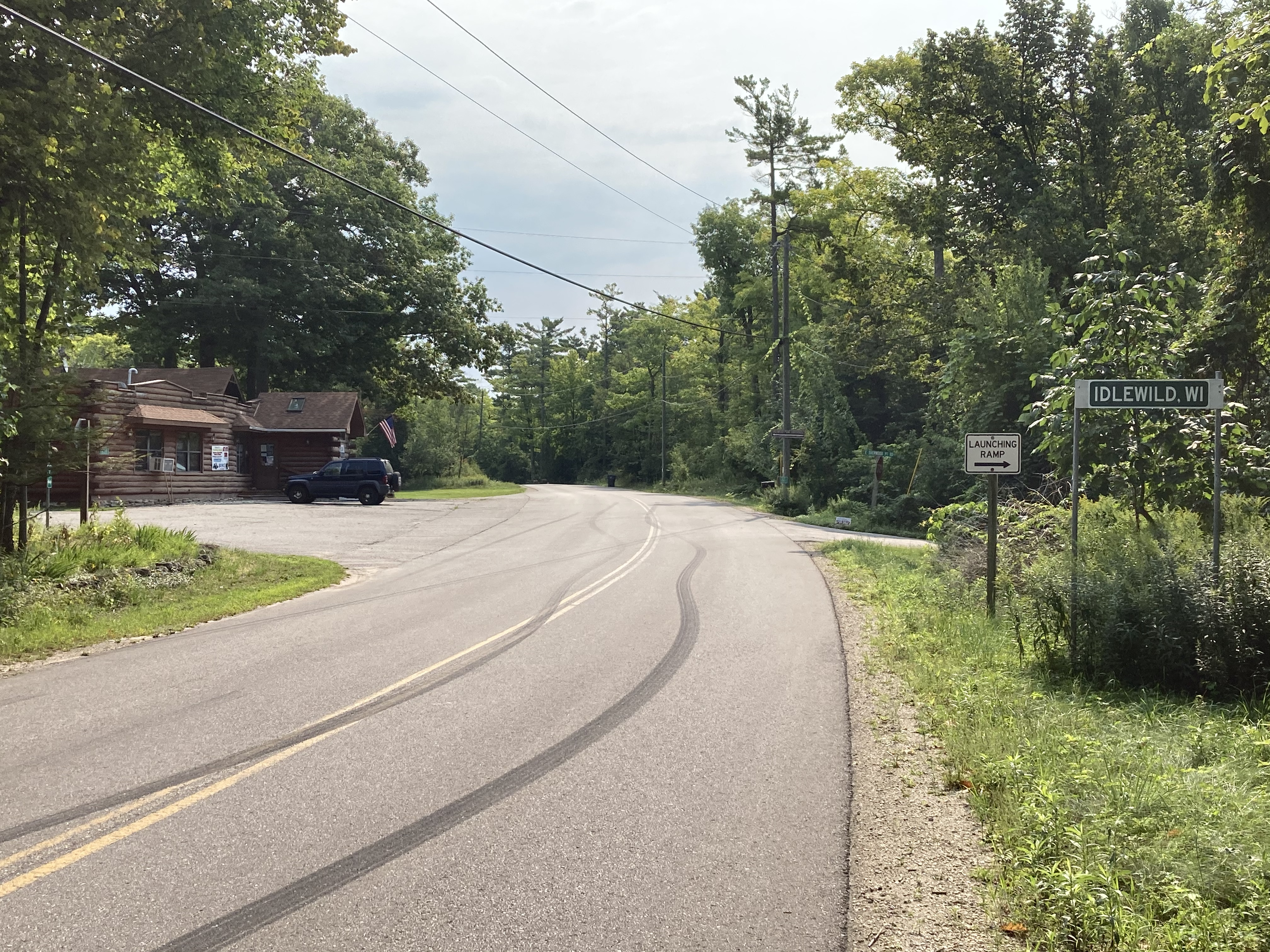
- Looking west in Idlewild

- Location within Wisconsin Location within the United States
- Coordinates: 44°53′18″N 87°25′38″W
- Country: United States
- State: Wisconsin
- County: Door
- Town: Nasewaupee
- Elevation: 591 ft (180 m)
- Time zone: UTC-6 (Central (CST))
  - Summer (DST): UTC-5 (CDT)
- Area code: 920
- GNIS feature ID: 1566852

Idlewild is an unincorporated community located in the town of Nasewaupee, Door County, Wisconsin, United States.

== History ==
Originally, Idlewild was Sherwoods Point, making it one of the earliest settlements in Door County on November 5, 1838.

== Attractions ==
- Sherwood Point Light is a lighthouse located near Idlewild.

== Climate ==
Sherwood and Cabot Points (both within the Idlewild area)

Climate chart (precipitation, max. and min. temperature)
J	F	M	A	M	J	J	A	S	O	N	D
57 −7 −12	54 −6 −12	60 −1 −7	129 11 −2	93 16 4	85 20 12	97 24 15	78 23 14	87 20 11	129 11 6	85 2 −1	65 −4 −8
- █ Average max. and min. temperatures in °C
- █ Precipitation totals in mm
Imperial conversion
J	F	M	A	M	J	J	A	S	O	N	D
2.2 19 10	2.1 21 10	2.4 30 19	5.1 52 28	3.7 61 39	3.3 68 54	3.8 75 59	3.1 73 57	3.4 68 52	5.1 52 43	3.3 36 30	2.6 25 18
- █ Average max. and min. temperatures in °F
- █ Precipitation totals in inches
