= Rhoenanthus speciosus =

Scientific classification
- Domain: Eukaryota
- Kingdom: Animalia
- Phylum: Arthropoda
- Class: Insecta
- Order: Ephemeroptera
- Family: Potamanthidae
- Genus: Rhoenanthus
- Species: R. speciosus

Binomial name
- Rhoenanthus speciosus Eaton, 1881

Species of mayfly

Rhoenanthus speciosus is a species of hacklegill mayfly in the family Potamanthidae.
