= Anthopotamus neglectus =

Scientific classification
- Domain: Eukaryota
- Kingdom: Animalia
- Phylum: Arthropoda
- Class: Insecta
- Order: Ephemeroptera
- Family: Potamanthidae
- Genus: Anthopotamus
- Species: A. neglectus

Binomial name
- Anthopotamus neglectus (Traver, 1935)

Synonyms
- Potamanthus neglectus Traver, 1935

Species of mayfly

Anthopotamus neglectus is a species of hacklegilled burrower mayfly in the family Potamanthidae. It is found in southeastern Canada and the northeastern United States.

== Subspecies ==
- Anthopotamus neglectus disjunctus Bae and McCafferty, 1991
- Anthopotamus neglectus neglectus (Traver, 1935)
