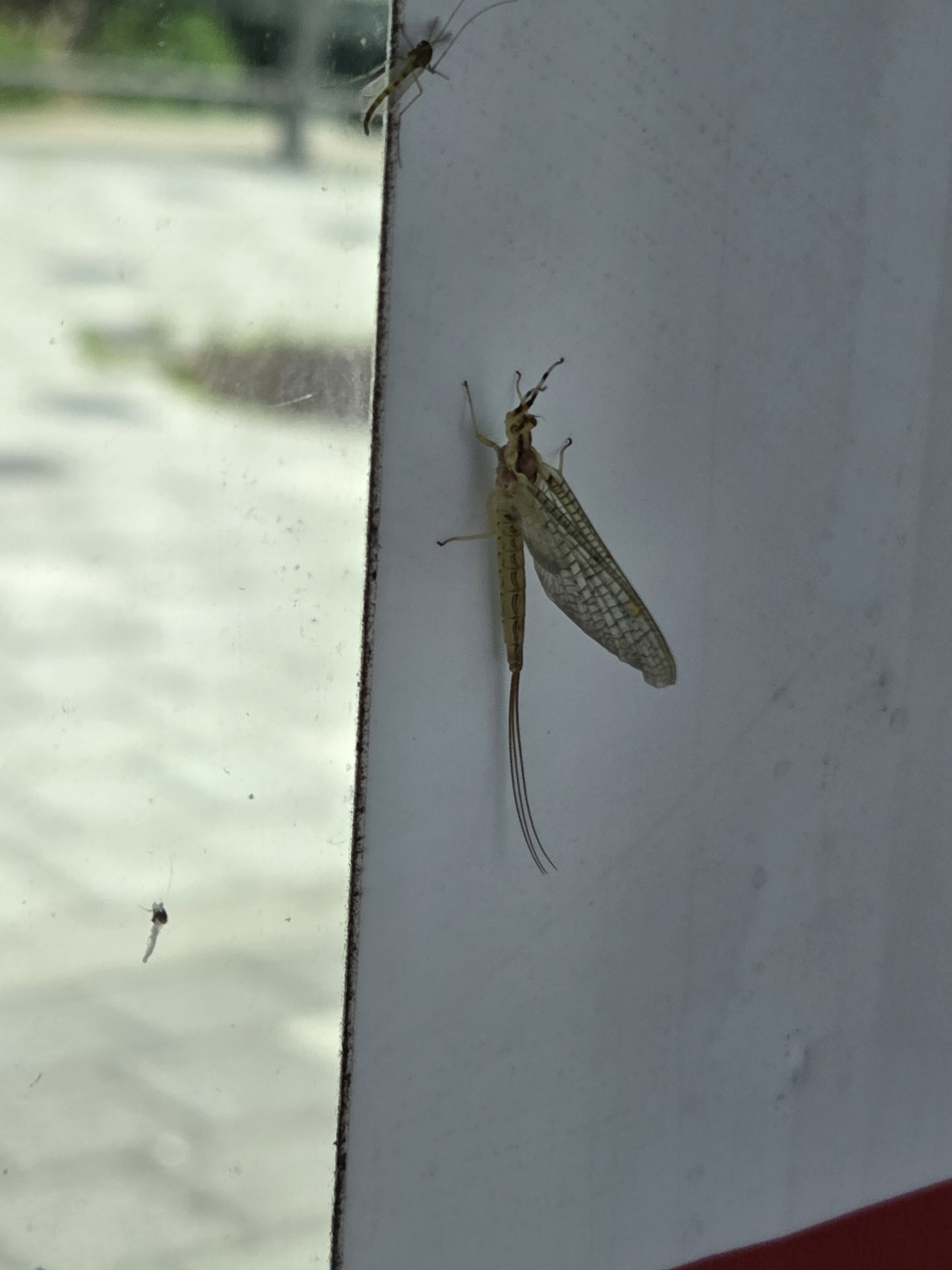

Scientific classification
- Kingdom: Animalia
- Phylum: Arthropoda
- Clade: Pancrustacea
- Class: Insecta
- Order: Ephemeroptera
- Family: Potamanthidae
- Genus: Rhoenanthus
- Species: R. coreanus

Binomial name
- Rhoenanthus coreanus (Yoon & Bae, 1985)

= Rhoenanthus coreanus =

Species of mayfly

Rhoenanthus coreanus is a species of hacklegill mayfly in the family Potamanthidae.
