= Potamanthus sangangensis =

Scientific classification
- Domain: Eukaryota
- Kingdom: Animalia
- Phylum: Arthropoda
- Class: Insecta
- Order: Ephemeroptera
- Family: Potamanthidae
- Genus: Potamanthus
- Species: P. sangangensis

Binomial name
- Potamanthus sangangensis (You, 1984)

Species of mayfly

Potamanthus sangangensis is a species of hacklegilled burrower mayfly in the family Potamanthidae.
