= Anthopotamus =

Scientific classification
- Domain: Eukaryota
- Kingdom: Animalia
- Phylum: Arthropoda
- Class: Insecta
- Order: Ephemeroptera
- Family: Potamanthidae
- Genus: Anthopotamus; McCafferty & Bae, 1990

Genus of mayflies

Anthopotamus is a genus of hacklegilled burrower mayflies in the family Potamanthidae. There are at least four described species in Anthopotamus.

== Species ==
- Anthopotamus distinctus (Traver, 1935)
- Anthopotamus myops (Walsh, 1863)
- Anthopotamus neglectus (Traver, 1935)
- Anthopotamus verticis (Say, 1839) (Walker's tusked sprawler)
