= Potamanthus yunnanensis =

Scientific classification
- Domain: Eukaryota
- Kingdom: Animalia
- Phylum: Arthropoda
- Class: Insecta
- Order: Ephemeroptera
- Family: Potamanthidae
- Genus: Potamanthus
- Species: P. yunnanensis

Binomial name
- Potamanthus yunnanensis (You, Wu, Gui & Hsu, 1982)

Species of mayfly

Potamanthus yunnanensis is a species of hacklegilled burrower mayfly in the family Potamanthidae.
