= Anthopotamus myops =

Scientific classification
- Domain: Eukaryota
- Kingdom: Animalia
- Phylum: Arthropoda
- Class: Insecta
- Order: Ephemeroptera
- Family: Potamanthidae
- Genus: Anthopotamus
- Species: A. myops

Binomial name
- Anthopotamus myops (Walsh, 1863)

Synonyms
- Anthopotamus inequalis Banks, 1908; Anthopotamus rufous Needham, 1909; Ephemera myops Argo, 1927; Potamanthus inequalis (Needham, 1909); Potamanthus medius (Argo, 1927); Potamanthus rufous Walsh, 1863; Potamanthus rufus Argo, 1927

Species of mayfly

Anthopotamus myops is a species of hacklegilled burrower mayfly in the family Potamanthidae. It is found in southeastern Canada and the eastern United States.
