= Potamanthus sabahensis =

Scientific classification
- Domain: Eukaryota
- Kingdom: Animalia
- Phylum: Arthropoda
- Class: Insecta
- Order: Ephemeroptera
- Family: Potamanthidae
- Genus: Potamanthus
- Species: P. sabahensis

Binomial name
- Potamanthus sabahensis (Bae & McCafferty, 1990)

Species of mayfly

Potamanthus sabahensis is a species of hacklegilled burrower mayfly in the family Potamanthidae.
