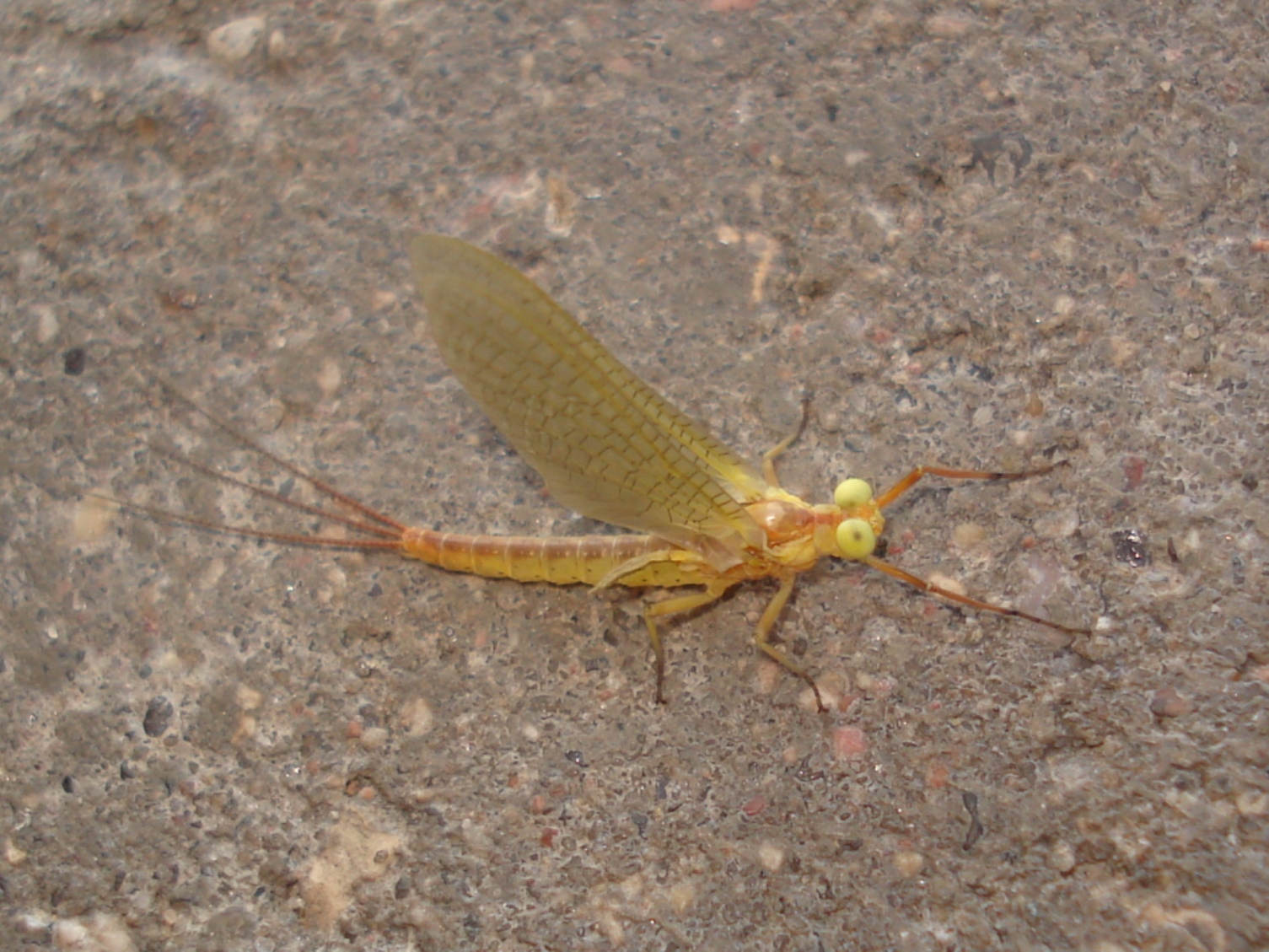
- Potamanthus luteus

Scientific classification
- Domain: Eukaryota
- Kingdom: Animalia
- Phylum: Arthropoda
- Class: Insecta
- Order: Ephemeroptera
- Suborder: Furcatergalia
- Infraorder: Scapphodonta
- Family: Potamanthidae; Albarda in Selys-Lonchamps, 1888

Genera
- Anthopotamus; Potamanthus; Rhoenanthus

= Potamanthidae =

Family of mayflies

Potamanthidae is a family of mayflies with three genera in which there are 23 species.

== Classification ==
Genus Anthopotamus

- Anthopotamus distinctus (Traver, 1935)
- Anthopotamus myops (Walsh, 1863)
- Anthopotamus verticis (Say, 1839)
- Anthopotamus neglectus (Traver, 1935)

Genus Potamanthus

- Potamanthus formosus Eaton, 1892
- Potamanthus huoshanensis Wu, 1987
- Potamanthus idiocerus Bae & McCafferty, 1991
- Potamanthus kwangsiensis (Hsu, 1937)
- Potamanthus longitibius Bae & McCafferty, 1991
- Potamanthus luteus (Linnaeus, 1767)
- Potamanthus macrophthalmus (You, 1984)
- Potamanthus nanchangi (Hsu, 1936)
- Potamanthus sabahensis (Bae & McCafferty, 1990)
- Potamanthus sangangensis (You, 1984)
- Potamanthus subcostalis Navás, 1932
- Potamanthus yooni Bae & McCafferty, 1991
- Potamanthus yunnanensis (You, Wu, Gui & Hsu, 1982)

Genus Rhoenanthus

- Rhoenanthus coreanus (Yoon & Bae, 1985)
- Rhoenanthus distafurcus (Bae & McCafferty 1991)
- Rhoenanthus magnificus (Ulmer 1920)
- Rhoenanthus obscurus (Navás, 1922)
- Rhoenanthus sapa (Nguyen & Bae, 2004)
- Rhoenanthus speciosus (Eaton 1881)
- Rhoenanthus youi (Wu & You, 1986)

Genus Stygifloris

- Stygifloris sp. EP141
