= Rhoenanthus sapa =

Scientific classification
- Domain: Eukaryota
- Kingdom: Animalia
- Phylum: Arthropoda
- Class: Insecta
- Order: Ephemeroptera
- Family: Potamanthidae
- Genus: Rhoenanthus
- Species: R. sapa

Binomial name
- Rhoenanthus sapa Nguyen & Bae, 2004

Species of mayfly

Rhoenanthus sapa is a species of hacklegill mayfly in the family Potamanthidae.
