= Rhoenanthus magnificus =

Scientific classification
- Domain: Eukaryota
- Kingdom: Animalia
- Phylum: Arthropoda
- Class: Insecta
- Order: Ephemeroptera
- Family: Potamanthidae
- Genus: Rhoenanthus
- Species: R. magnificus

Binomial name
- Rhoenanthus magnificus Ulmer, 1920

Species of mayfly

Rhoenanthus magnificus is a species of hacklegill mayfly in the family Potamanthidae.
