= Potamanthus subcostalis =

Scientific classification
- Domain: Eukaryota
- Kingdom: Animalia
- Phylum: Arthropoda
- Class: Insecta
- Order: Ephemeroptera
- Family: Potamanthidae
- Genus: Potamanthus
- Species: P. subcostalis

Binomial name
- Potamanthus subcostalis Navás, 1932

Species of mayfly

Potamanthus subcostalis is a species of hacklegilled burrower mayfly in the family Potamanthidae.
