= Anthopotamus distinctus =

Scientific classification
- Domain: Eukaryota
- Kingdom: Animalia
- Phylum: Arthropoda
- Class: Insecta
- Order: Ephemeroptera
- Family: Potamanthidae
- Genus: Anthopotamus
- Species: A. distinctus

Binomial name
- Anthopotamus distinctus (Traver, 1935)

Synonyms
- Potamanthus distinctus Traver, 1935

Species of mayfly

Anthopotamus distinctus is a species of hacklegilled burrower mayfly in the family Potamanthidae. It is found in southeastern Canada and the eastern United States.
