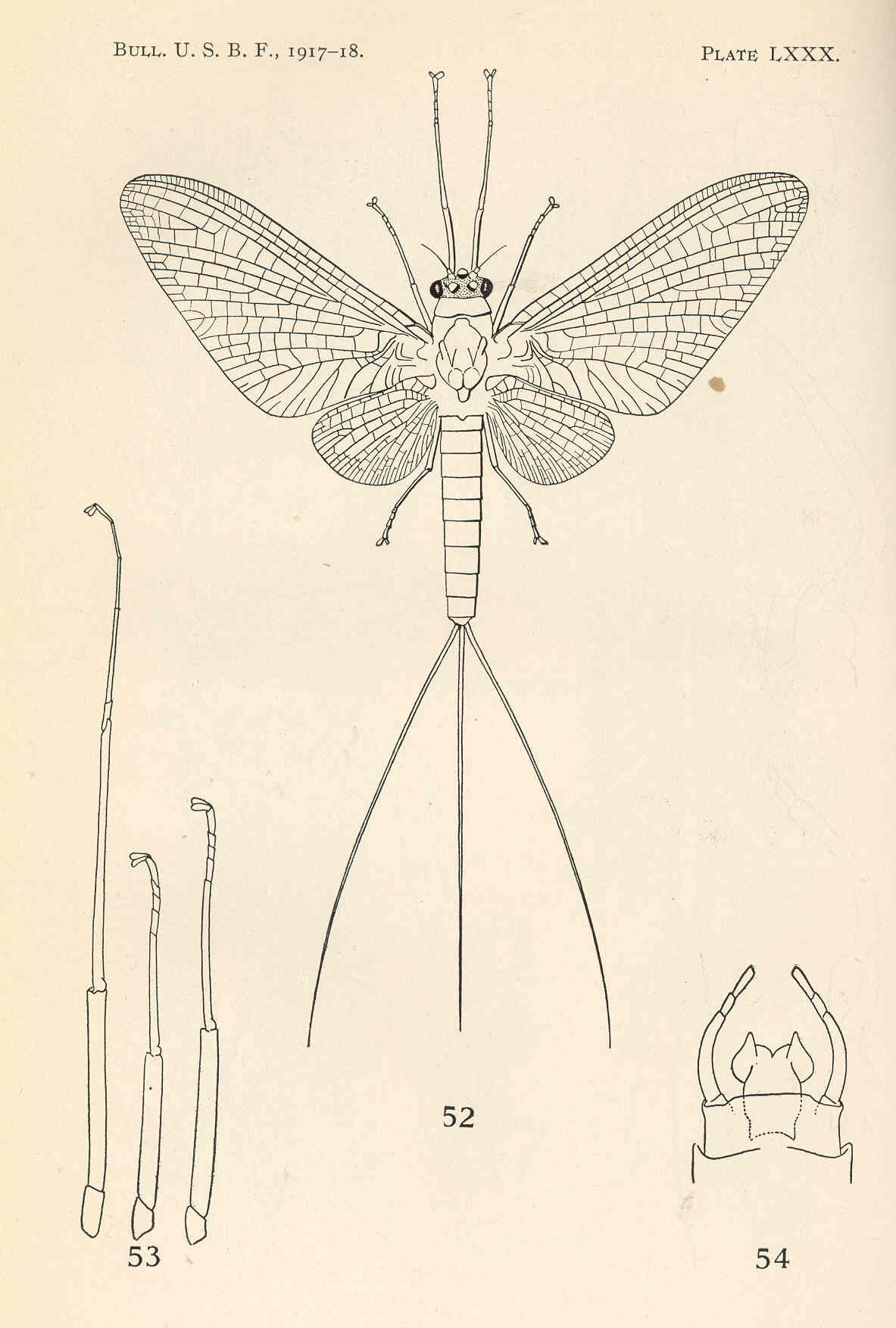

Scientific classification
- Domain: Eukaryota
- Kingdom: Animalia
- Phylum: Arthropoda
- Class: Insecta
- Order: Ephemeroptera
- Family: Potamanthidae
- Genus: Anthopotamus
- Species: A. verticis

Binomial name
- Anthopotamus verticis (Say, 1839)

Synonyms
- Anthopotamus diaphanus Needham, 1907; Anthopotamus walkeri (Walsh, 1862); Baetis verticis Ide, 1935; Ephemera flaveola (Needham, 1907); Potamanthus betteni (Ide, 1935); Potamanthus diaphanus Say, 1839; Potamanthus flaveola Walsh, 1862; Potamanthus walkeri Morgan, 1913

= Anthopotamus verticis =

Species of mayfly

Anthopotamus verticis, or Walker's tusked sprawler, is a species of hacklegilled burrower mayfly in the family Potamanthidae. It is found in southeastern Canada and the northern and southeastern United States.
