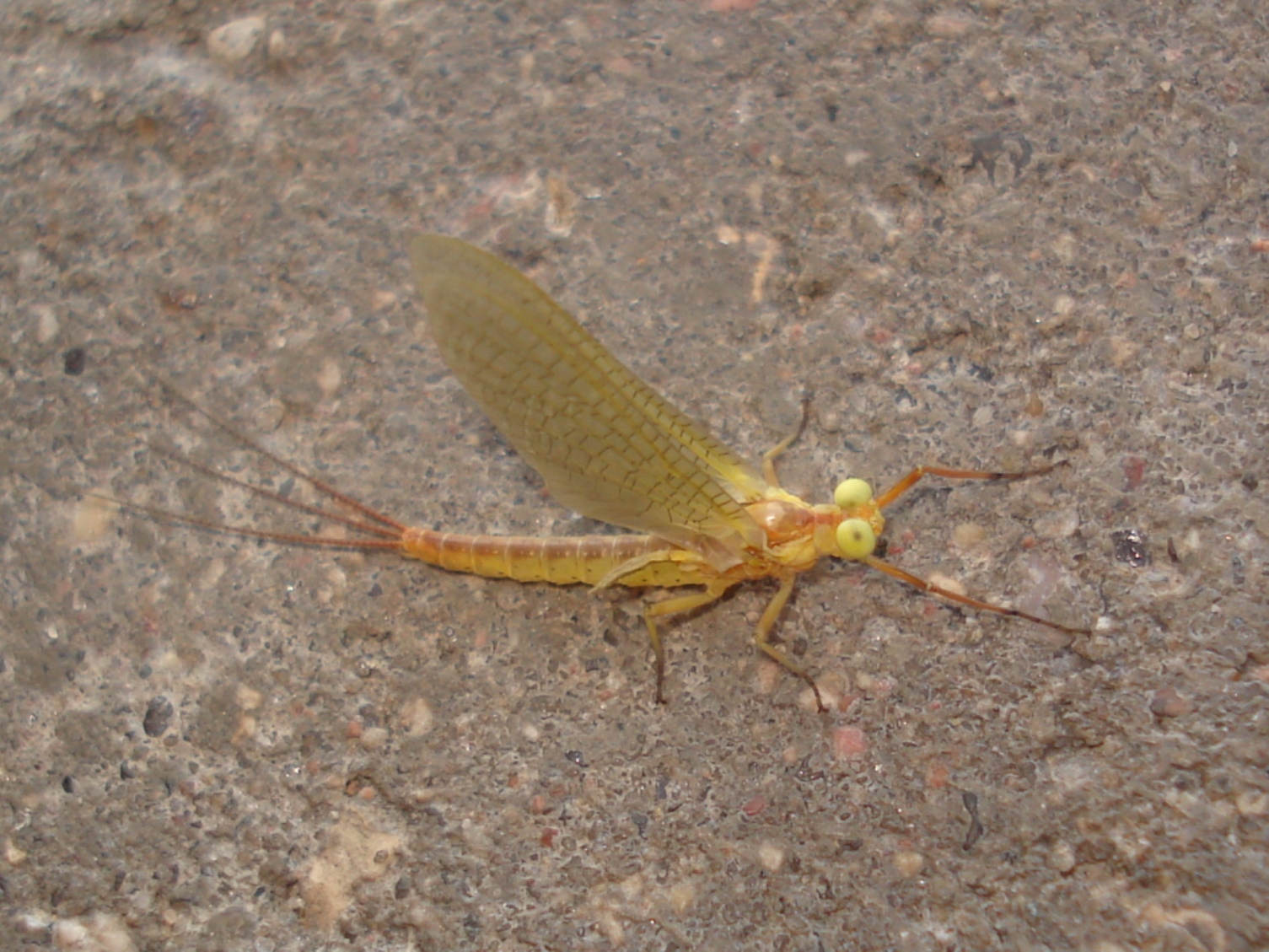
- Potamanthus luteus

Scientific classification
- Domain: Eukaryota
- Kingdom: Animalia
- Phylum: Arthropoda
- Class: Insecta
- Order: Ephemeroptera
- Family: Potamanthidae
- Genus: Potamanthus; Pictet, 1845

Synonyms
- Eucharidis Joly, 1877; Potamanthodes Ulmer, 1920; Stygifloris Bae, McCafferty & Edmunds, 1990

= Potamanthus =

Genus of mayflies

Potamanthus is the type genus of the family Potamanthidae, sometimes called "hackle-gilled burrower mayflies". Species of Potamanthushave been recorded from the Palaearctic Nearctic and Oriental realms.

== Species ==
The following species belong to the genus Potamanthus:

1. Potamanthus aeneus Pictet, 1843
2. Potamanthus brunneus Pictet, 1843
3. Potamanthus castaneus Pictet, 1843
4. Potamanthus formosus Eaton, 1892^{c g}
5. Potamanthus gibbus Pictet, 1843
6. Potamanthus huoshanensis Wu, 1987^{c g}
7. Potamanthus idiocerus Bae & McCafferty, 1991^{c g}
8. Potamanthus inanis Pictet, 1843
9. Potamanthus kwangsiensis (Hsu, 1937)^{c g}
10. Potamanthus longitibius Bae & McCafferty, 1991^{c g}
11. Potamanthus luteus (Linnaeus, 1767)^{i c g}
12. Potamanthus macrophthalmus (You, 1984)^{c g}
13. Potamanthus nanchangi (Hsu, 1936)^{c g}
14. Potamanthus sabahensis (Bae & McCafferty, 1990)^{c g}
15. Potamanthus sangangensis (You, 1984)^{c g}
16. Potamanthus subcostalis Navás, 1932^{c g}
17. Potamanthus yooni Bae & McCafferty, 1991^{c g}
18. Potamanthus yunnanensis (You, Wu, Gui & Hsu, 1982)^{c g}

Data sources: i = ITIS, c = Catalogue of Life, g = GBIF, b = Bugguide.net
