= Potamanthus yooni =

Scientific classification
- Domain: Eukaryota
- Kingdom: Animalia
- Phylum: Arthropoda
- Class: Insecta
- Order: Ephemeroptera
- Family: Potamanthidae
- Genus: Potamanthus
- Species: P. yooni

Binomial name
- Potamanthus yooni Bae & McCafferty, 1991

Species of mayfly

Potamanthus yooni (Korean: 금빛하루살이) is a species of mayfly native to Korea. Taking the species out of the country is prohibited by the South Korean Government.
