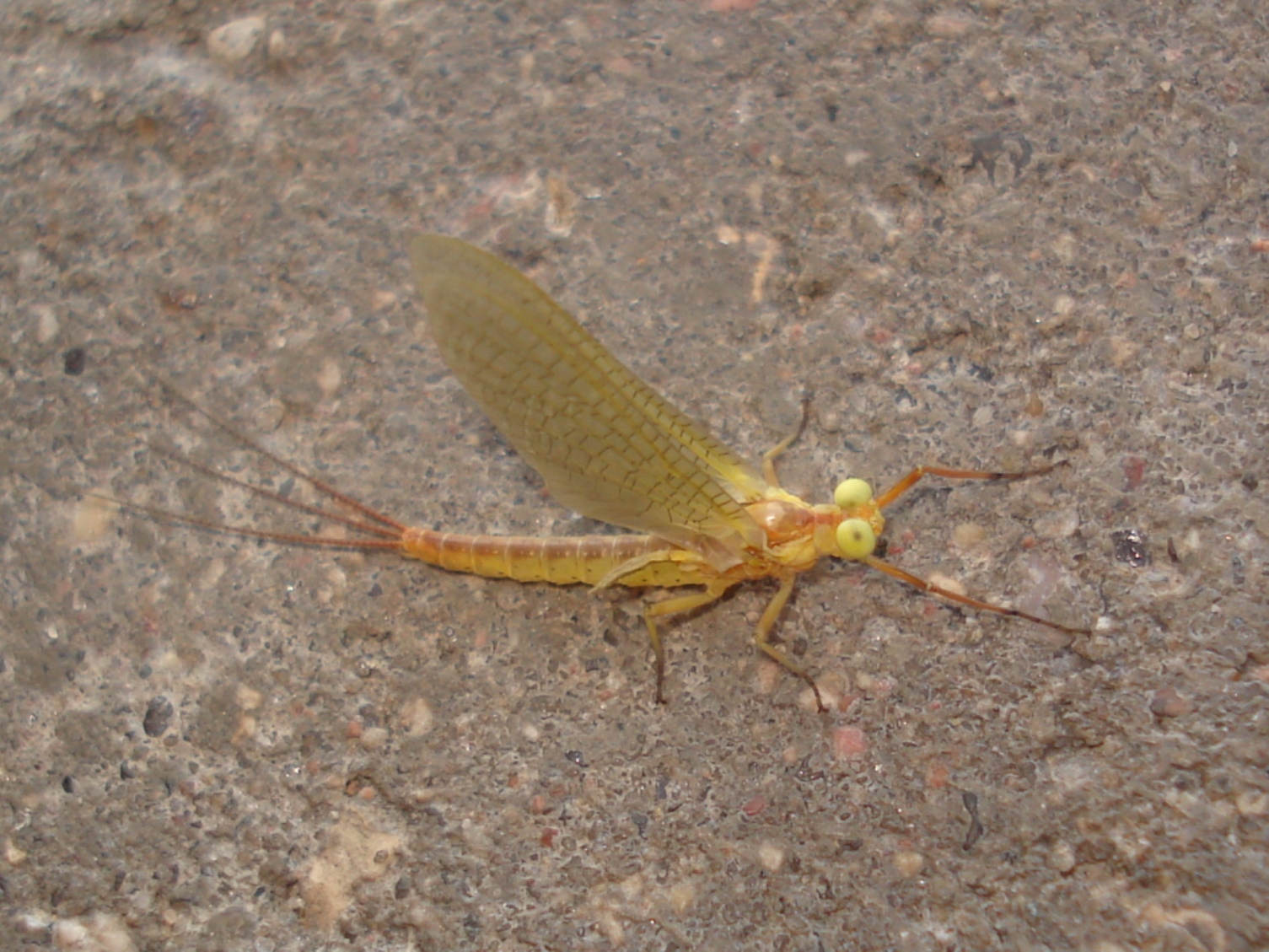

Scientific classification
- Kingdom: Animalia
- Phylum: Arthropoda
- Class: Insecta
- Order: Ephemeroptera
- Family: Potamanthidae
- Genus: Potamanthus
- Species: P. luteus

Binomial name
- Potamanthus luteus (Linnaeus, 1767)

= Potamanthus luteus =

Species of mayfly

Potamanthus luteus (popularly 'Yellow Mayfly') is a species of hacklegilled burrower mayfly in the family Potamanthidae. According to Fauna Europaea it is found over a range of mainland Europe. In the UK it is or was found principally on the Rivers Usk and Wye in the UK; in the Usk it may have become extinct and in the Wye it has suffered a population crash.
