= Heptagenia solitaria =

Conservation status
- Secure (NatureServe)

Scientific classification
- Kingdom: Animalia
- Phylum: Arthropoda
- Class: Insecta
- Order: Ephemeroptera
- Family: Heptageniidae
- Genus: Heptagenia
- Species: H. solitaria

Binomial name
- Heptagenia solitaria McDunnough, 1924

Species of mayfly

Heptagenia solitaria, also known as the solitary flat-headed mayfly, is a species of mayfly in the family Heptageniidae. It is found in southwestern and northern Canada, and the western United States.
