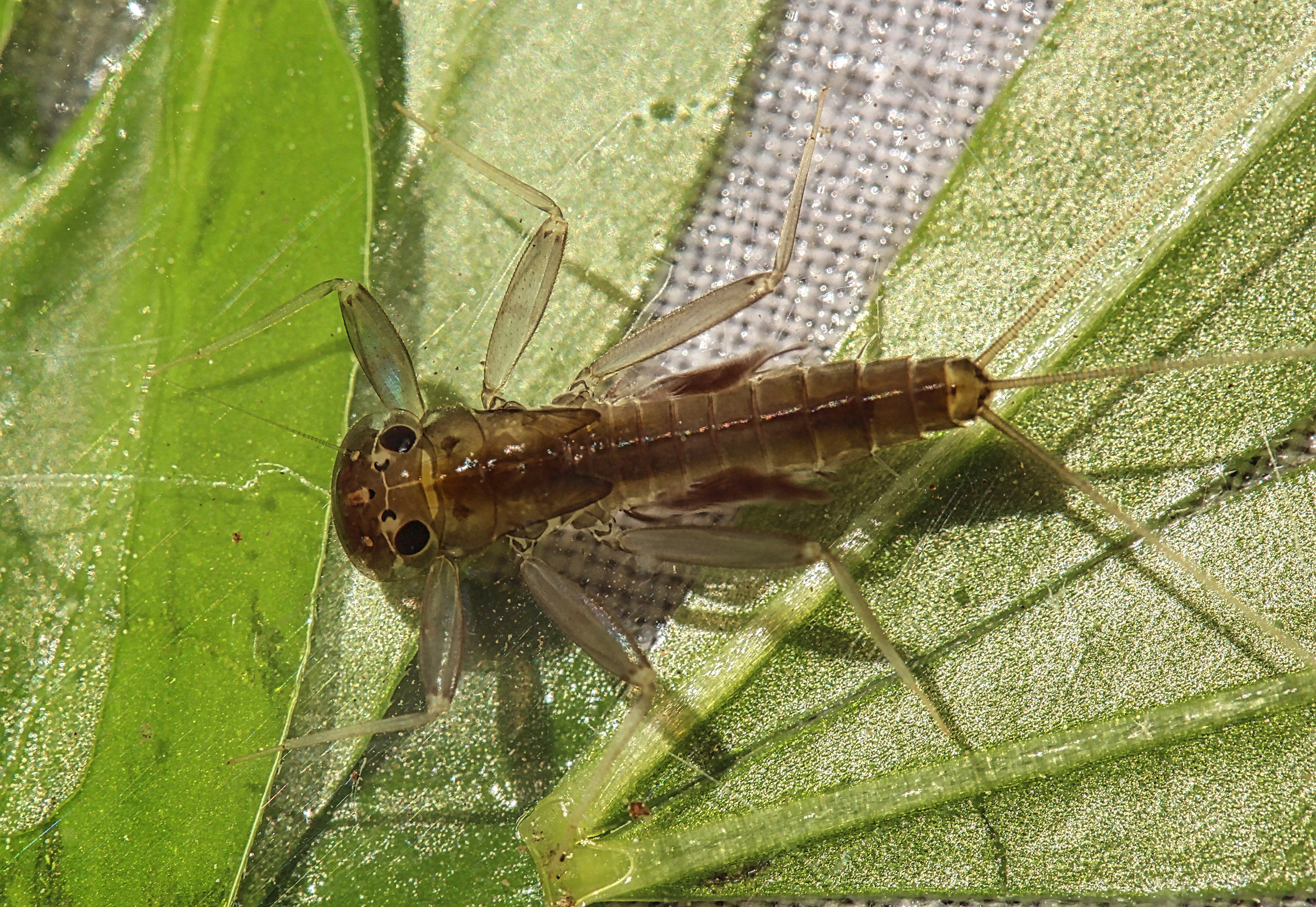
- Flatheaded mayfly, Stenacron carolina

Scientific classification
- Domain: Eukaryota
- Kingdom: Animalia
- Phylum: Arthropoda
- Class: Insecta
- Order: Ephemeroptera
- Family: Heptageniidae
- Genus: Stenacron
- Species: S. carolina

Binomial name
- Stenacron carolina (Banks, 1914)

Synonyms
- Heptagenia carolina Banks, 1914

= Stenacron carolina =

Species of mayfly

Stenacron carolina is a species of flatheaded mayfly in the family Heptageniidae. It is found in North America.
