= Stenacron pallidum =

Scientific classification
- Domain: Eukaryota
- Kingdom: Animalia
- Phylum: Arthropoda
- Class: Insecta
- Order: Ephemeroptera
- Family: Heptageniidae
- Genus: Stenacron
- Species: S. pallidum

Binomial name
- Stenacron pallidum (Traver, 1933)

Synonyms
- Stenonema pallidum Traver, 1933

Species of mayfly

Stenacron pallidum is a species of flatheaded mayfly in the family Heptageniidae. It is found in the eastern United States.
