= Maccaffertium exiguum =

Scientific classification
- Domain: Eukaryota
- Kingdom: Animalia
- Phylum: Arthropoda
- Class: Insecta
- Order: Ephemeroptera
- Family: Heptageniidae
- Genus: Maccaffertium
- Species: M. exiguum

Binomial name
- Maccaffertium exiguum (Traver, 1933)

Synonyms
- Stenonema alabamae Traver, 1937; Stenonema exiguum Traver, 1933; Stenonema quinquespinum Lewis, 1974

Species of mayfly

Maccaffertium exiguum is a species of flatheaded mayfly in the family Heptageniidae. It is found in North America.
