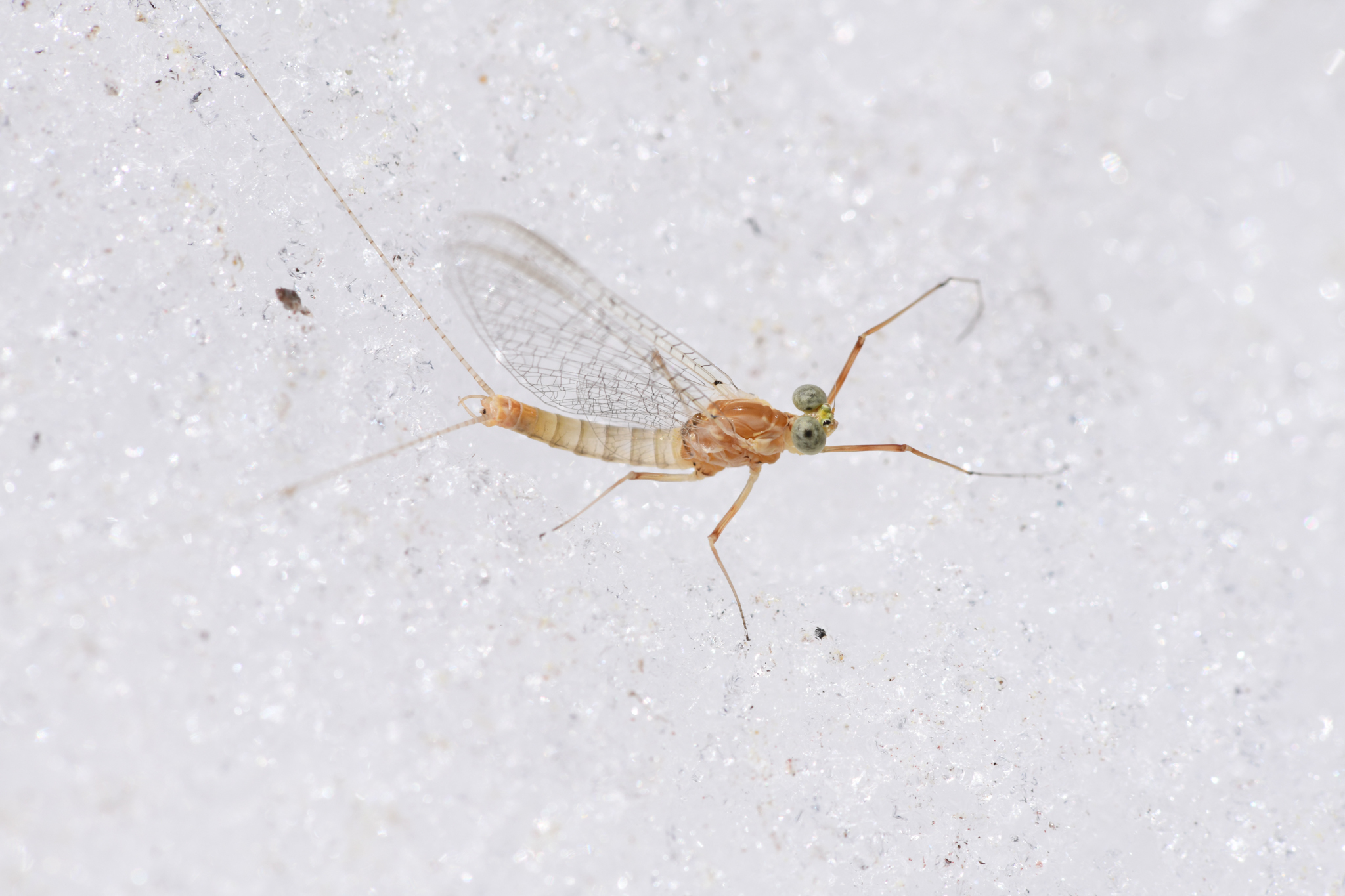

Scientific classification
- Domain: Eukaryota
- Kingdom: Animalia
- Phylum: Arthropoda
- Class: Insecta
- Order: Ephemeroptera
- Family: Heptageniidae
- Genus: Heptagenia
- Species: H. elegantula

Binomial name
- Heptagenia elegantula (Eaton, 1885)

Synonyms
- Heptagenia coxalis Banks, 1914; Heptagenia diabasia Burks, 1946; Heptagenia querula McDunnough, 1924; Rhithrogena elegantula Eaton, 1885

= Heptagenia elegantula =

Species of insect

Heptagenia elegantula is a species of flatheaded mayfly in the family Heptageniidae. It is found in Central America and North America. In North America its range includes all of Canada, northern Mexico, and the continental United States.
