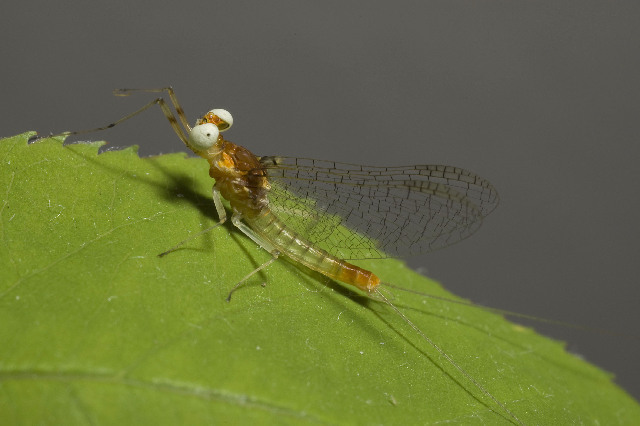

Scientific classification
- Kingdom: Animalia
- Phylum: Arthropoda
- Class: Insecta
- Order: Ephemeroptera
- Family: Heptageniidae
- Genus: Maccaffertium
- Species: M. terminatum

Binomial name
- Maccaffertium terminatum (Walsh, 1862)

Synonyms
- Palingenia terminata Walsh, 1862

= Maccaffertium terminatum =

Species of mayfly

Maccaffertium terminatum is a species of flatheaded mayfly in the family Heptageniidae. It is found in all of Canada.

== Subspecies ==
These two subspecies belong to the species Maccaffertium terminatum:

- Maccaffertium terminatum placitum (Banks, 1910)
- Maccaffertium terminatum terminatum (Walsh, 1862)
