= Leucrocuta walshi =

Scientific classification
- Domain: Eukaryota
- Kingdom: Animalia
- Phylum: Arthropoda
- Class: Insecta
- Order: Ephemeroptera
- Family: Heptageniidae
- Genus: Leucrocuta
- Species: L. walshi

Binomial name
- Leucrocuta walshi (McDunnough, 1926)

Synonyms
- Heptagenia walshi McDunnough, 1926

Species of mayfly

Leucrocuta walshi is a species of flatheaded mayfly in the family Heptageniidae. It is found in North America.
