= Leucrocuta thetis =

Scientific classification
- Domain: Eukaryota
- Kingdom: Animalia
- Phylum: Arthropoda
- Class: Insecta
- Order: Ephemeroptera
- Family: Heptageniidae
- Genus: Leucrocuta
- Species: L. thetis

Binomial name
- Leucrocuta thetis (Traver, 1935)

Synonyms
- Heptagenia thetis Traver, 1935

Species of mayfly

Leucrocuta thetis is a species of flatheaded mayfly in the family Heptageniidae. It is found in North America.
