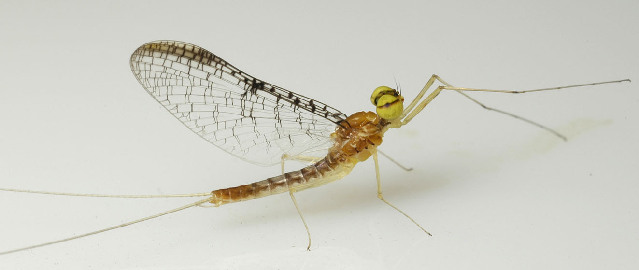

Scientific classification
- Domain: Eukaryota
- Kingdom: Animalia
- Phylum: Arthropoda
- Class: Insecta
- Order: Ephemeroptera
- Family: Heptageniidae
- Genus: Leucrocuta
- Species: L. aphrodite

Binomial name
- Leucrocuta aphrodite (McDunnough, 1926)

Synonyms
- Heptagenia aphrodite McDunnough, 1926

= Leucrocuta aphrodite =

Species of mayfly

Leucrocuta aphrodite is a species of flatheaded mayfly in the family Heptageniidae. It is found in southeastern Canada, the southern, and northeastern United States.
