= Stenacron gildersleevei =

Scientific classification
- Domain: Eukaryota
- Kingdom: Animalia
- Phylum: Arthropoda
- Class: Insecta
- Order: Ephemeroptera
- Family: Heptageniidae
- Genus: Stenacron
- Species: S. gildersleevei

Binomial name
- Stenacron gildersleevei (Traver, 1935)

Synonyms
- Stenonema gildersleevei Traver, 1935

Species of mayfly

Stenacron gildersleevei, or Gildersleeve's stenacron mayfly, is a species of flatheaded mayfly in the family Heptageniidae. It is found in North America.
