= Heptagenia flavescens =

Scientific classification
- Domain: Eukaryota
- Kingdom: Animalia
- Phylum: Arthropoda
- Class: Insecta
- Order: Ephemeroptera
- Family: Heptageniidae
- Genus: Heptagenia
- Species: H. flavescens

Binomial name
- Heptagenia flavescens (Walsh, 1862)

Synonyms
- Palingenia flavescens Walsh, 1862

Species of mayfly

Heptagenia flavescens is a species of flatheaded mayfly in the family Heptageniidae. It is found in Central America and North America.
