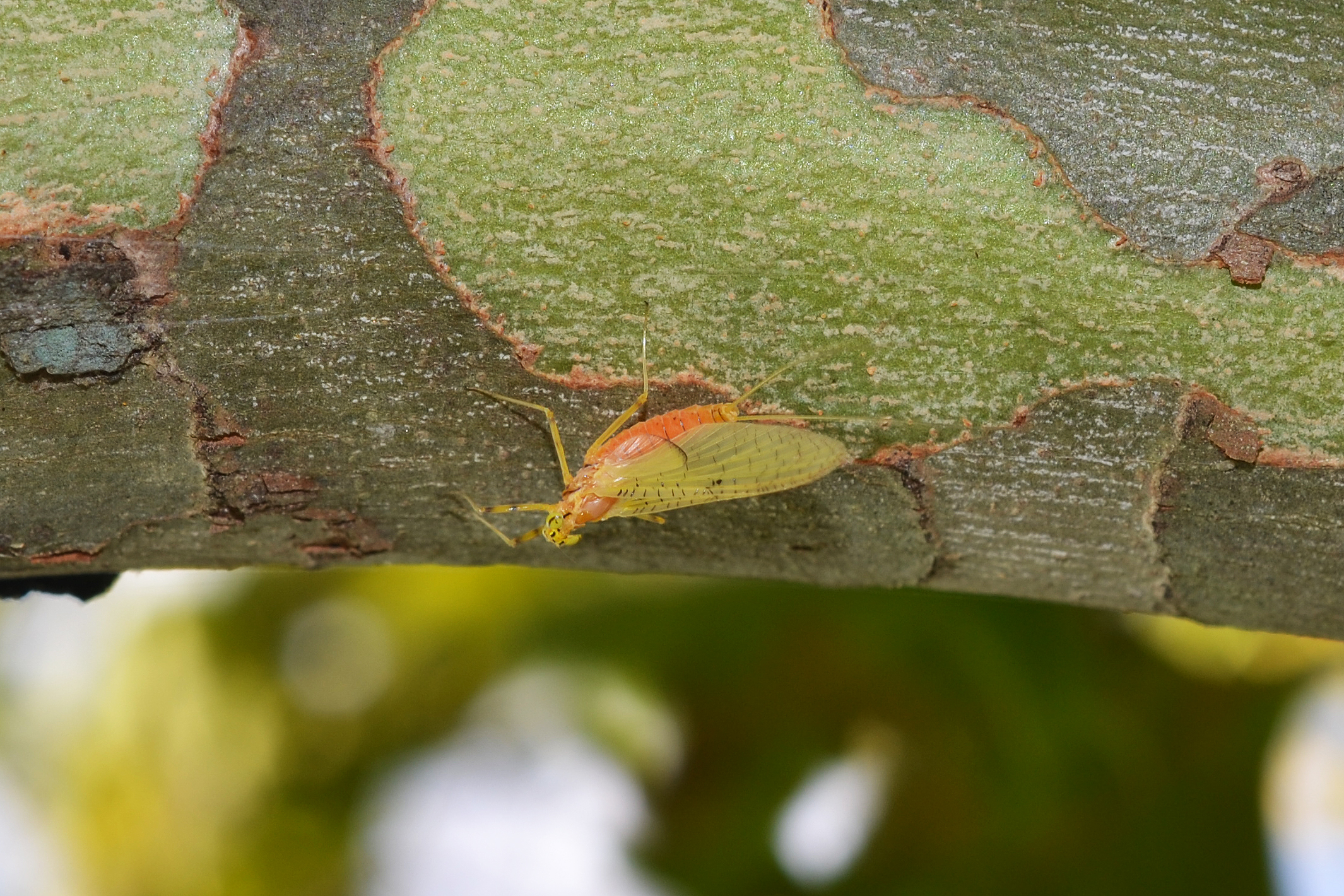

Scientific classification
- Kingdom: Animalia
- Phylum: Arthropoda
- Class: Insecta
- Order: Ephemeroptera
- Family: Heptageniidae
- Genus: Stenacron
- Species: S. interpunctatum

Binomial name
- Stenacron interpunctatum (Say, 1839)

Synonyms
- Baetis canadensis Walker, 1853; Baetis interpunctata Say, 1839; Ecdyonurus canadensis (Walker, 1853); Ecdyonurus frontalis (Banks, 1910); Ecdyonurus heterotarsalis McDunnough, 1933; Ecdyurus canadensis (Walker, 1853); Heptagenia canadensis (Walker, 1853); Heptagenia frontalis Banks, 1910; Stenacron affine (Traver, 1933); Stenacron areion (Burks, 1953); Stenacron canadense (Walker, 1853); Stenacron conjunctum (Traver, 1935); Stenacron frontale (Banks, 1910); Stenacron heterotarsale (McDunnough, 1933); Stenacron interpunctatum canadense (Walker, 1853); Stenacron interpunctatum frontale (Banks, 1910); Stenacron interpunctatum heterotarsale (McDunnough, 1933); Stenacron majus (Traver, 1935); Stenacron proximum (Traver, 1935); Stenocron frontale (Banks, 1910); Stenonema affine Traver, 1933; Stenonema areion Burks, 1953; Stenonema canadense (Walker, 1853); Stenonema conjunctum Traver, 1935; Stenonema frontale (Banks, 1910); Stenonema heterotarsale (McDunnough, 1933); Stenonema interpunctatum canadense (Walker, 1853); Stenonema interpunctatum frontale (Banks, 1910); Stenonema interpunctatum heterotarsale (McDunnough, 1933); Stenonema majus Traver, 1935; Stenonema ohioense Traver, 1935; Stenonema proximum Traver, 1935

= Stenacron interpunctatum =

Species of mayfly

Stenacron interpunctatum, the stenacron mayfly, is a species of flatheaded mayfly in the family Heptageniidae. It is found in North America. Larvae are detritivores and often found underneath stones.

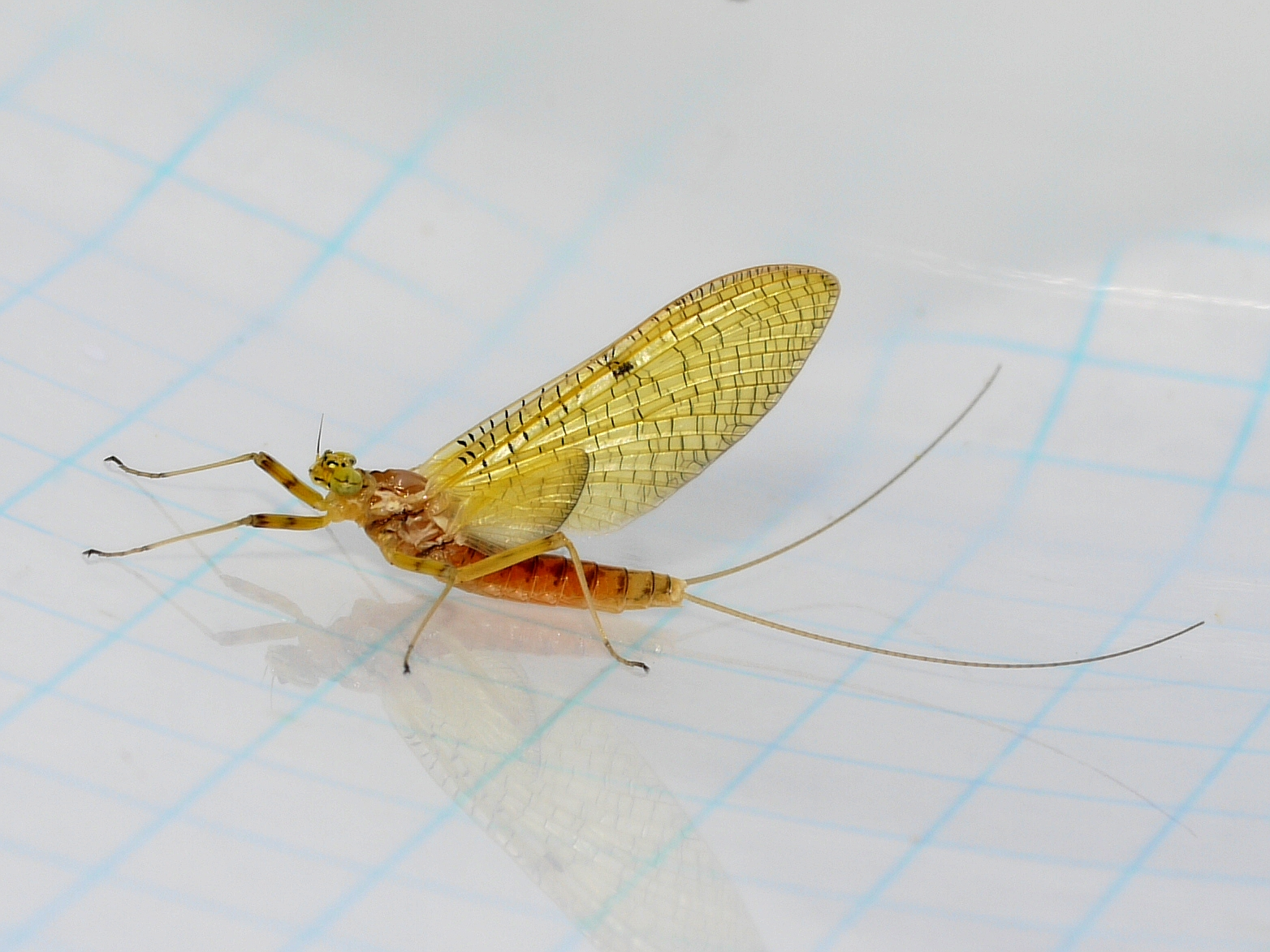
Stenacron mayfly, Stenacron interpunctatum

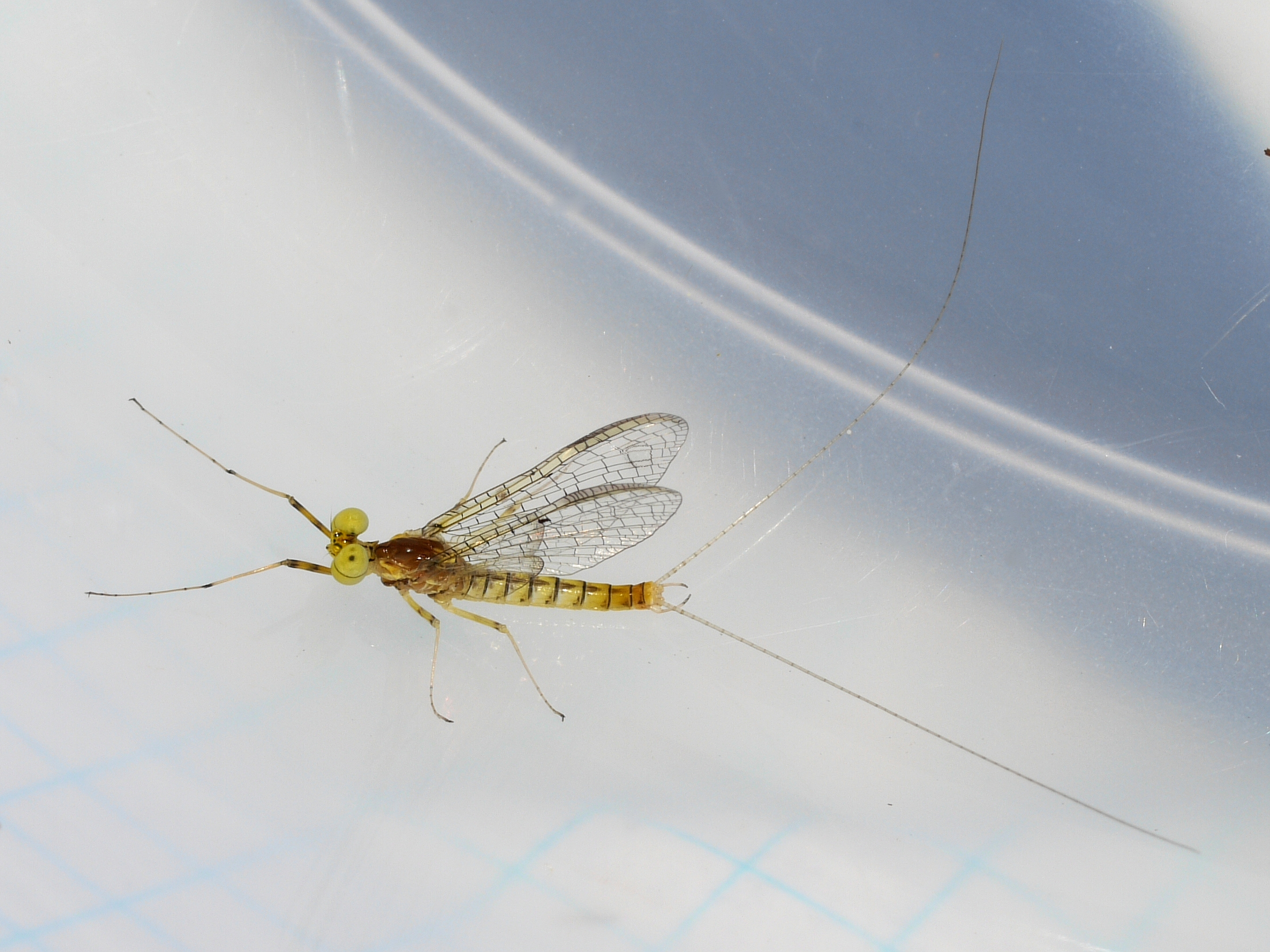
Stenacron mayfly, Stenacron interpunctatum
