= Leucrocuta jewetti =

Scientific classification
- Domain: Eukaryota
- Kingdom: Animalia
- Phylum: Arthropoda
- Class: Insecta
- Order: Ephemeroptera
- Family: Heptageniidae
- Genus: Leucrocuta
- Species: L. jewetti

Binomial name
- Leucrocuta jewetti (Allen, 1966)

Synonyms
- Heptagenia jewetti Allen, 1966

Species of mayfly

Leucrocuta jewetti is a species of flatheaded mayfly in the family Heptageniidae. It is found in southeastern Canada and the northwestern United States.
