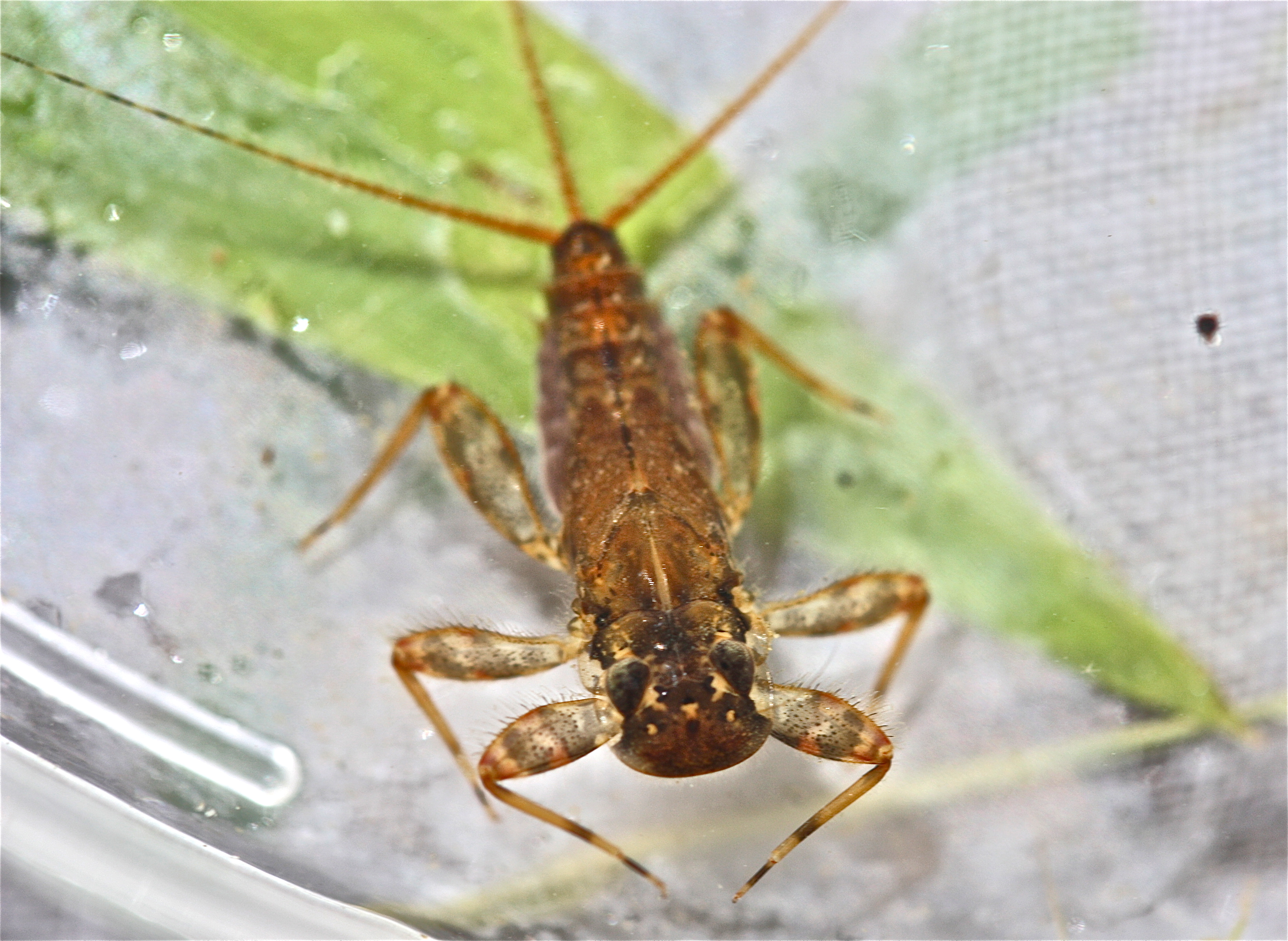

Scientific classification
- Domain: Eukaryota
- Kingdom: Animalia
- Phylum: Arthropoda
- Class: Insecta
- Order: Ephemeroptera
- Family: Heptageniidae
- Genus: Maccaffertium
- Species: M. ithaca

Binomial name
- Maccaffertium ithaca (Clemens & Leonard, 1924)

Synonyms
- Heptagenia ithaca Clemens and Leonard, 1924; Stenonema allegheniense Carle, 1977

= Maccaffertium ithaca =

Species of mayfly

Maccaffertium ithaca is a species of flatheaded mayfly in the family Heptageniidae. It is found in North America.
