= Stenacron floridense =

Scientific classification
- Domain: Eukaryota
- Kingdom: Animalia
- Phylum: Arthropoda
- Class: Insecta
- Order: Ephemeroptera
- Family: Heptageniidae
- Genus: Stenacron
- Species: S. floridense

Binomial name
- Stenacron floridense (Lewis, 1974)

Synonyms
- Stenonema floridense Lewis, 1974

Species of mayfly

Stenacron floridense is a species of flatheaded mayfly in the family Heptageniidae. It is found in North America.
