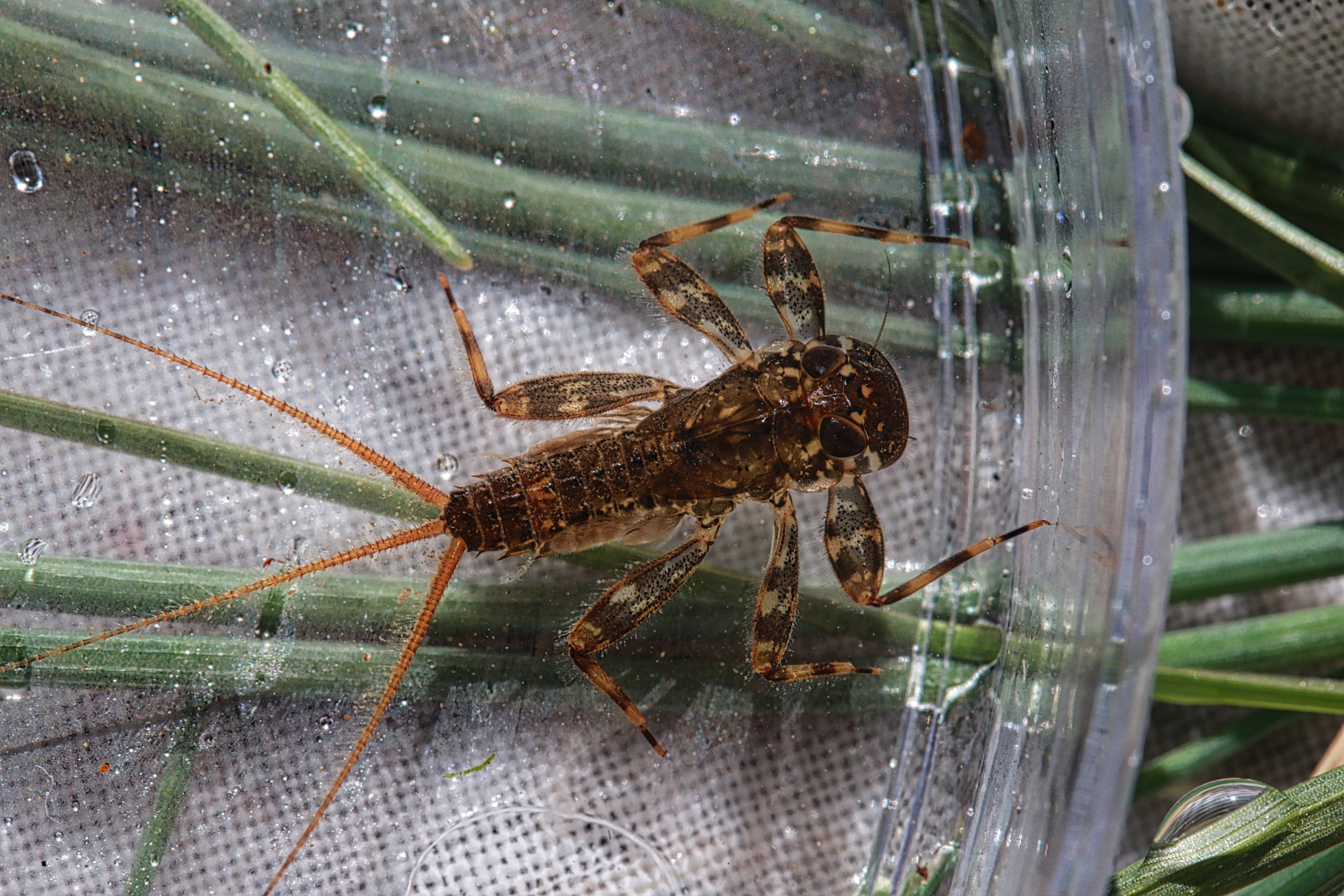

Scientific classification
- Domain: Eukaryota
- Kingdom: Animalia
- Phylum: Arthropoda
- Class: Insecta
- Order: Ephemeroptera
- Family: Heptageniidae
- Genus: Maccaffertium
- Species: M. pudicum

Binomial name
- Maccaffertium pudicum (Hagen, 1861)

Synonyms
- Ephemera pudica Hagen, 1861

= Maccaffertium pudicum =

Species of mayfly

Maccaffertium pudicum is a species of flatheaded mayfly in the family Heptageniidae. It is found in North America.

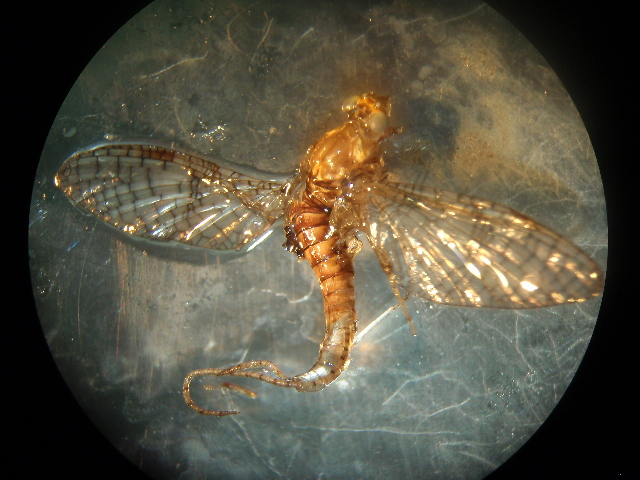
