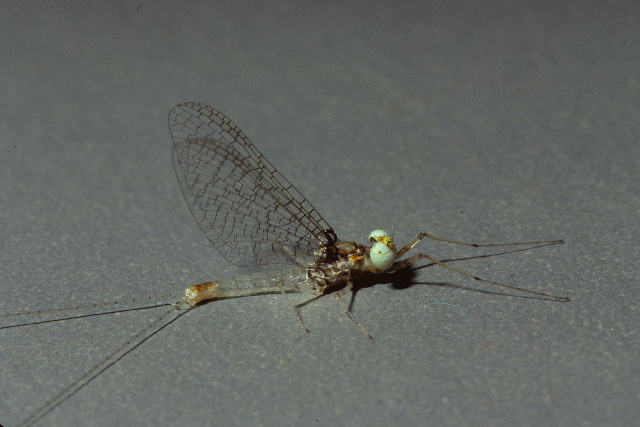

Scientific classification
- Domain: Eukaryota
- Kingdom: Animalia
- Phylum: Arthropoda
- Class: Insecta
- Order: Ephemeroptera
- Family: Heptageniidae
- Genus: Maccaffertium
- Species: M. pulchellum

Binomial name
- Maccaffertium pulchellum (Walsh, 1862)

Synonyms
- Palingenia pulchella Walsh, 1862

= Maccaffertium pulchellum =

Species of mayfly

Maccaffertium pulchellum is a species of flatheaded mayfly in the family Heptageniidae. It is found in North America.
