= Leucrocuta maculipennis =

Scientific classification
- Domain: Eukaryota
- Kingdom: Animalia
- Phylum: Arthropoda
- Class: Insecta
- Order: Ephemeroptera
- Family: Heptageniidae
- Genus: Leucrocuta
- Species: L. maculipennis

Binomial name
- Leucrocuta maculipennis (Walsh, 1863)

Synonyms
- Heptagenia maculipennis Walsh, 1863

Species of mayfly

Leucrocuta maculipennis is a species of flatheaded mayfly in the family Heptageniidae. It is found in North America.
