= Leucrocuta juno =

Scientific classification
- Domain: Eukaryota
- Kingdom: Animalia
- Phylum: Arthropoda
- Class: Insecta
- Order: Ephemeroptera
- Family: Heptageniidae
- Genus: Leucrocuta
- Species: L. juno

Binomial name
- Leucrocuta juno (McDunnough, 1924)

Synonyms
- Heptagenia juno McDunnough, 1924

Species of mayfly

Leucrocuta juno is a species of flatheaded mayfly in the family Heptageniidae. It is found in North America.
