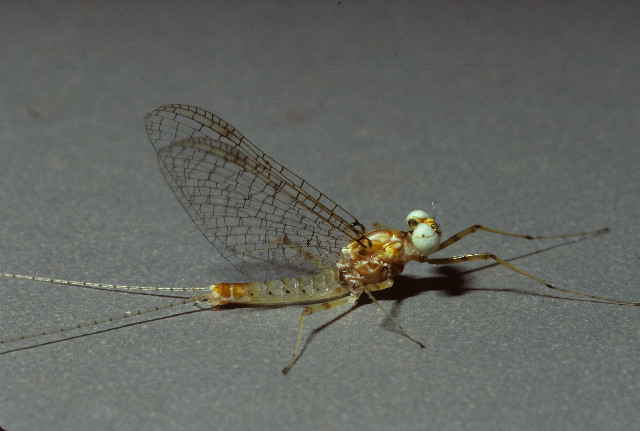

Scientific classification
- Domain: Eukaryota
- Kingdom: Animalia
- Phylum: Arthropoda
- Class: Insecta
- Order: Ephemeroptera
- Family: Heptageniidae
- Genus: Maccaffertium
- Species: M. mediopunctatum

Binomial name
- Maccaffertium mediopunctatum (McDunnough, 1926)

Synonyms
- Ecdyonurus mediopunctatus McDunnough, 1926

= Maccaffertium mediopunctatum =

Species of mayfly

Maccaffertium mediopunctatum is a species of flat-headed mayfly in the family Heptageniidae. It is found in Southeastern Canada and the Eastern United States.

== Subspecies ==
These two subspecies belong to the species Maccaffertium mediopunctatum:

- Maccaffertium mediopunctatum arwini (Bednarik and McCafferty, 1979)^{i g}
- Maccaffertium mediopunctatum mediopunctatum (McDunnough, 1926)^{i g b}

Data sources: i = ITIS, c = Catalogue of Life, g = GBIF, b = Bugguide.net
