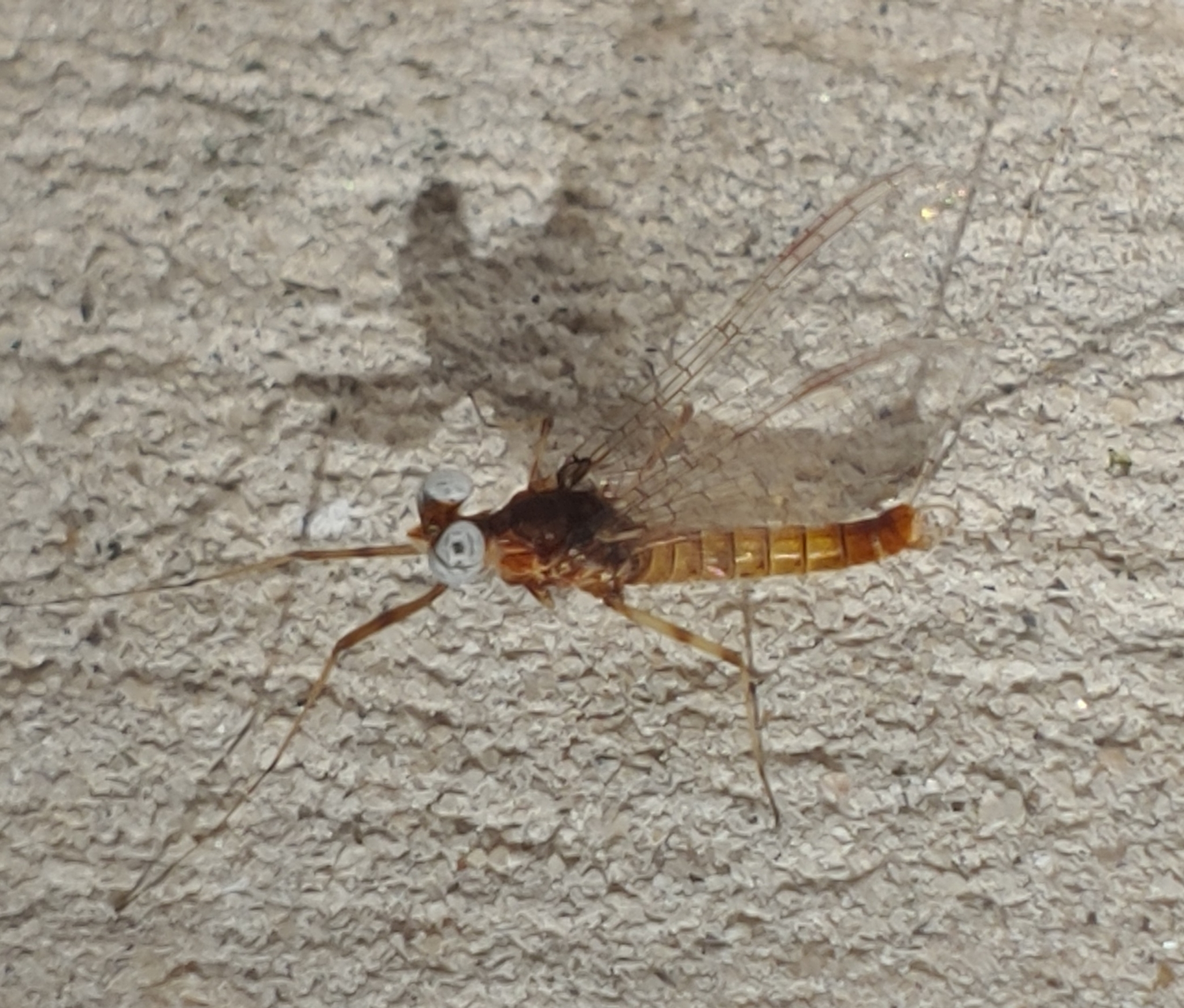

Scientific classification
- Kingdom: Animalia
- Phylum: Arthropoda
- Class: Insecta
- Order: Ephemeroptera
- Family: Heptageniidae
- Genus: Maccaffertium
- Species: M. smithae

Binomial name
- Maccaffertium smithae (Traver, 1937)

Synonyms
- Stenonema smithae Traver, 1937; Heptagenia smithae (Traver, 1937)

= Maccaffertium smithae =

Species of mayfly

Maccaffertium smithae is a species of flatheaded mayfly in the family Heptageniidae. It is found in North America.
