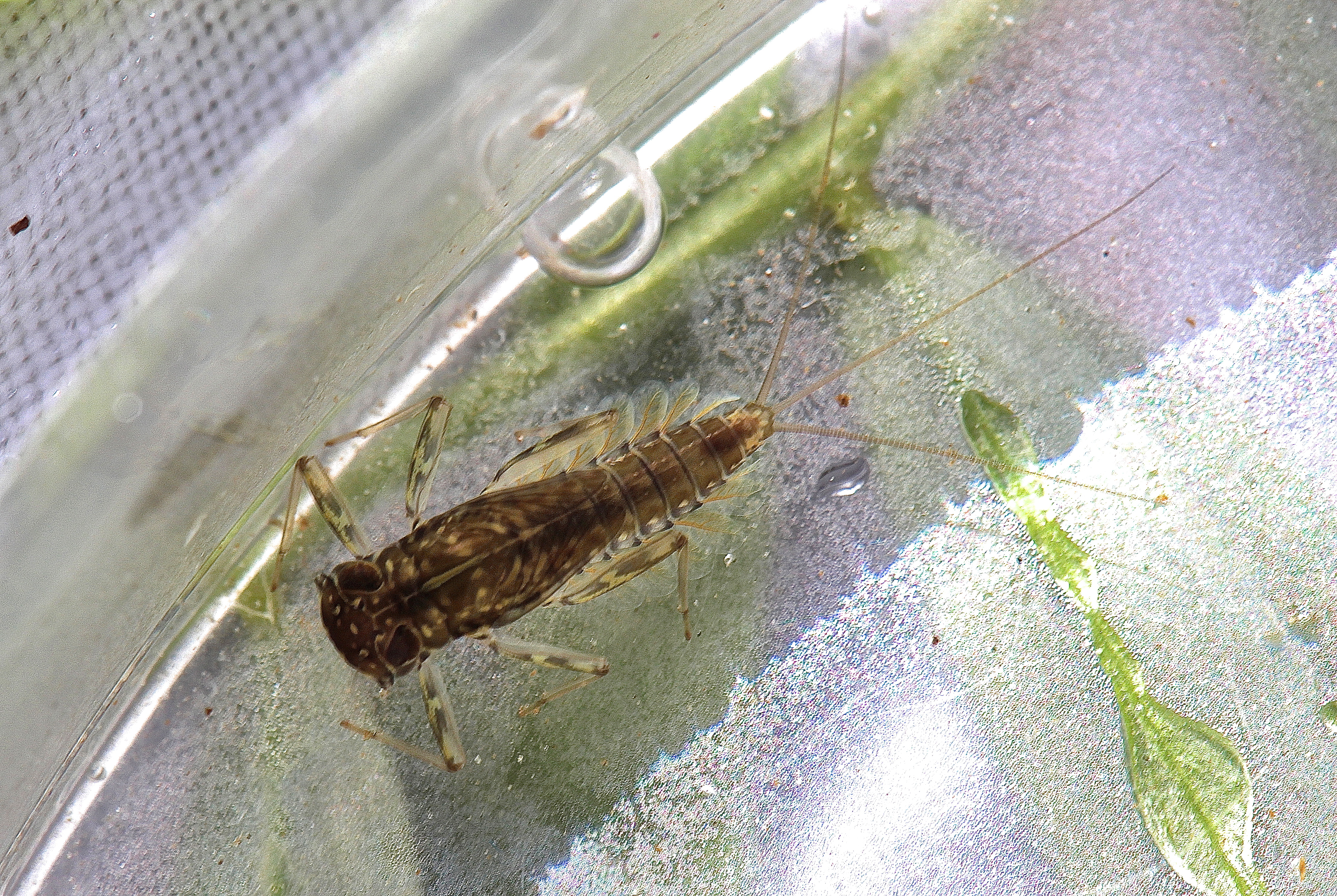
- Flatheaded mayfly, Cinygmula subaequalis

Scientific classification
- Domain: Eukaryota
- Kingdom: Animalia
- Phylum: Arthropoda
- Class: Insecta
- Order: Ephemeroptera
- Family: Heptageniidae
- Genus: Cinygmula
- Species: C. subaequalis

Binomial name
- Cinygmula subaequalis (Banks, 1914)

Synonyms
- Cinygma atlantica McDunnough, 1924; Cinygmula atlantica (McDunnough, 1924); Heptagenia subaequalis Banks, 1914

= Cinygmula subaequalis =

Species of mayfly

Cinygmula subaequalis is a species of flatheaded mayfly in the family Heptageniidae. It is found in southeastern, northern Canada, the eastern United States, and Alaska.
