= Leucrocuta petersi =

Scientific classification
- Domain: Eukaryota
- Kingdom: Animalia
- Phylum: Arthropoda
- Class: Insecta
- Order: Ephemeroptera
- Family: Heptageniidae
- Genus: Leucrocuta
- Species: L. petersi

Binomial name
- Leucrocuta petersi (Allen, 1966)

Synonyms
- Heptagenia petersi Allen, 1966

Species of mayfly

Leucrocuta petersi is a species of flatheaded mayfly in the family Heptageniidae. It is found in North America.
