= March brown mayfly =

March brown mayfly is a common name for several insects and may refer to:

- Maccaffertium vicarium, native to North America
- Rhithrogena germanica, native to Europe
- Rhithrogena morrisoni, native to North America
