= Ecdyonurus criddlei =

Scientific classification
- Domain: Eukaryota
- Kingdom: Animalia
- Phylum: Arthropoda
- Class: Insecta
- Order: Ephemeroptera
- Family: Heptageniidae
- Genus: Ecdyonurus
- Species: E. criddlei

Binomial name
- Ecdyonurus criddlei (McDunnough, 1927)

Synonyms
- Ecdyonurus otiosus (McDunnough, 1935); Ecdyonurus rosea (Traver, 1935); Ecdyonurus salvini (Kimmins, 1934); Heptagenia criddlei McDunnough, 1927; Heptagenia otiosa McDunnough, 1935; Heptagenia rosea Traver, 1935; Heptagenia rubroventris Traver, 1935; Heptagenia salvini Kimmins, 1934; Nixe otiosa (McDunnough, 1935); Nixe rosea (Traver, 1935); Nixe salvini (Kimmins, 1934)

Species of mayfly

Ecdyonurus criddlei, the little slate-winged dun, is a species of flatheaded mayfly in the family Heptageniidae. It is found in Central America and North America. In North America its range includes southwestern Canada, northern Mexico, the western United States, and Hawaii.
