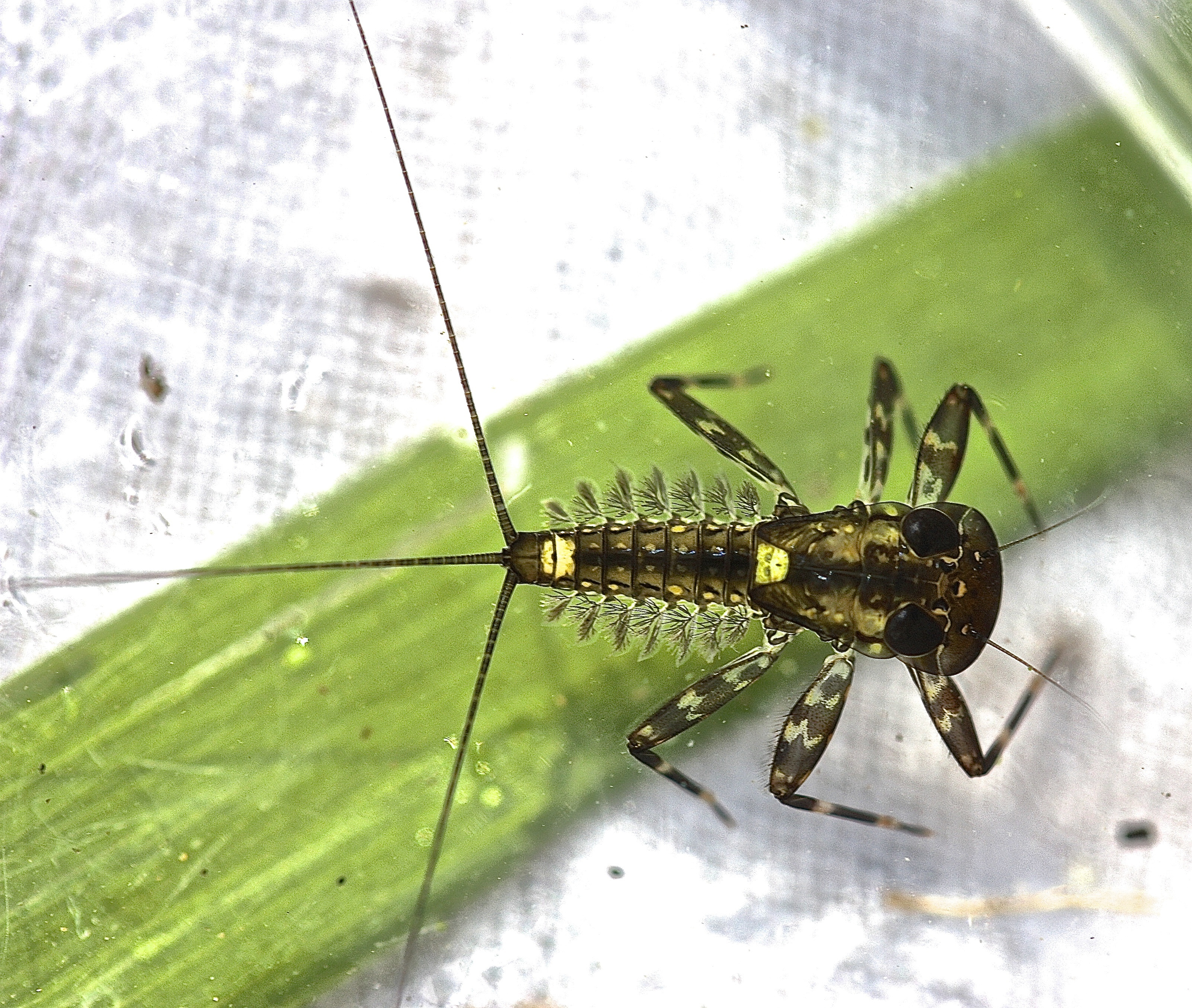
- Flatheaded mayfly - Heptagenia marginalis

Scientific classification
- Domain: Eukaryota
- Kingdom: Animalia
- Phylum: Arthropoda
- Class: Insecta
- Order: Ephemeroptera
- Family: Heptageniidae
- Genus: Heptagenia
- Species: H. marginalis

Binomial name
- Heptagenia marginalis Banks, 1910

= Heptagenia marginalis =

Species of insect

Heptagenia marginalis is a species of flatheaded mayfly in the family Heptageniidae. It is found in North America.
