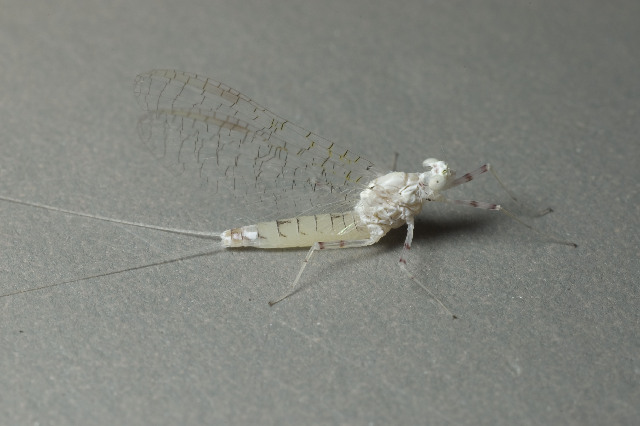

Scientific classification
- Domain: Eukaryota
- Kingdom: Animalia
- Phylum: Arthropoda
- Class: Insecta
- Order: Ephemeroptera
- Family: Heptageniidae
- Genus: Maccaffertium
- Species: M. mexicanum

Binomial name
- Maccaffertium mexicanum (Ulmer, 1920)

Synonyms
- Heptagenia mexicana Ulmer, 1920

= Maccaffertium mexicanum =

Species of mayfly

Maccaffertium mexicanum is a species of flatheaded mayfly in the family Heptageniidae. It is found in Central America and North America. In North America its range includes southern Mexico.

== Subspecies ==
These two subspecies belong to the species Maccaffertium mexicanum:

- Maccaffertium mexicanum integrum (McDunnough, 1924)
- Maccaffertium mexicanum mexicanum (Ulmer, 1920)
