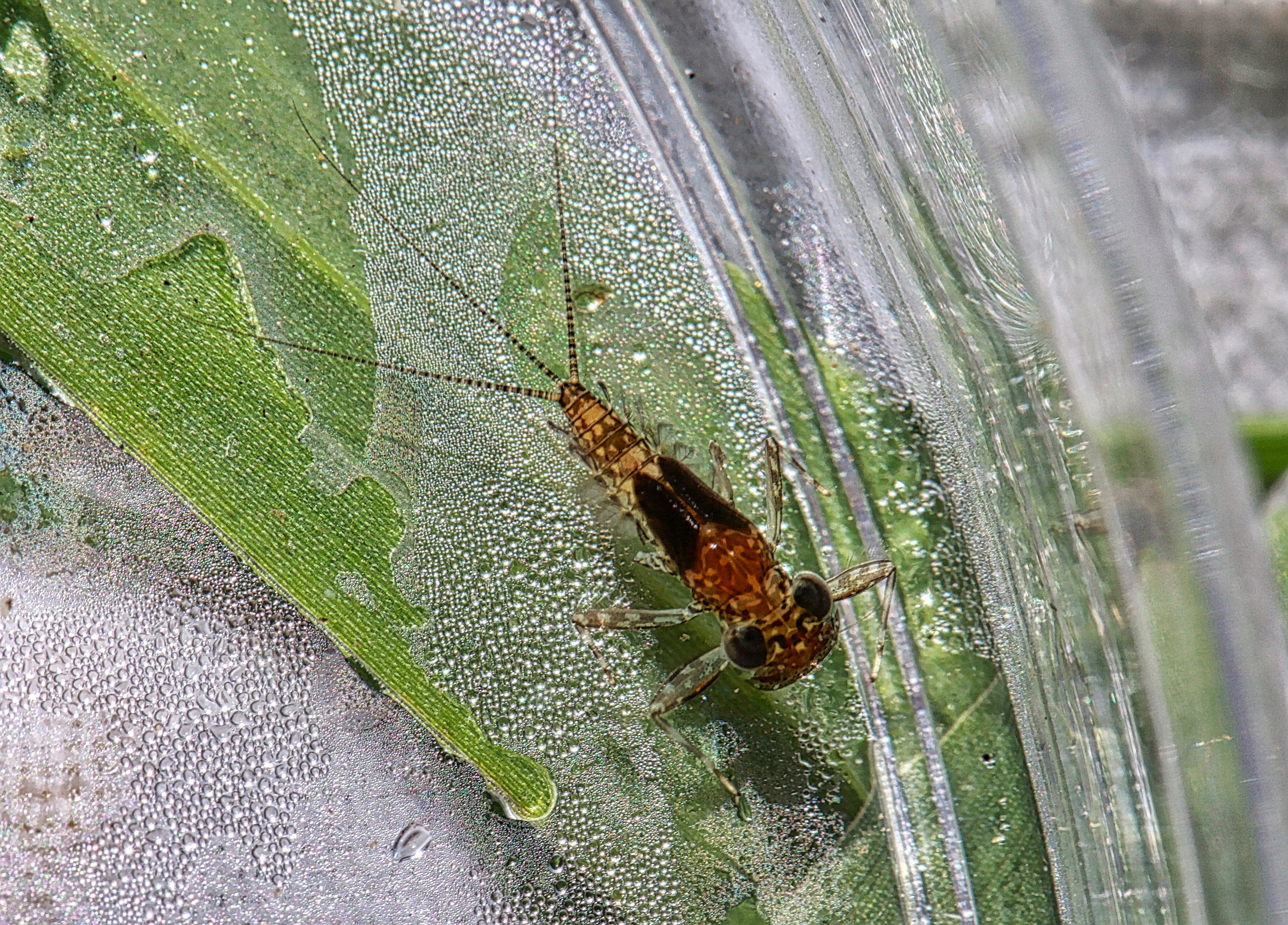

Scientific classification
- Domain: Eukaryota
- Kingdom: Animalia
- Phylum: Arthropoda
- Class: Insecta
- Order: Ephemeroptera
- Family: Heptageniidae
- Genus: Leucrocuta
- Species: L. hebe

Binomial name
- Leucrocuta hebe (McDunnough, 1924)

Synonyms
- Heptagenia hebe McDunnough, 1924

= Leucrocuta hebe =

Species of mayfly

Leucrocuta hebe is a species of flatheaded mayfly in the family Heptageniidae. It is found in southeastern, northern Canada, the northern, and southeastern United States.
