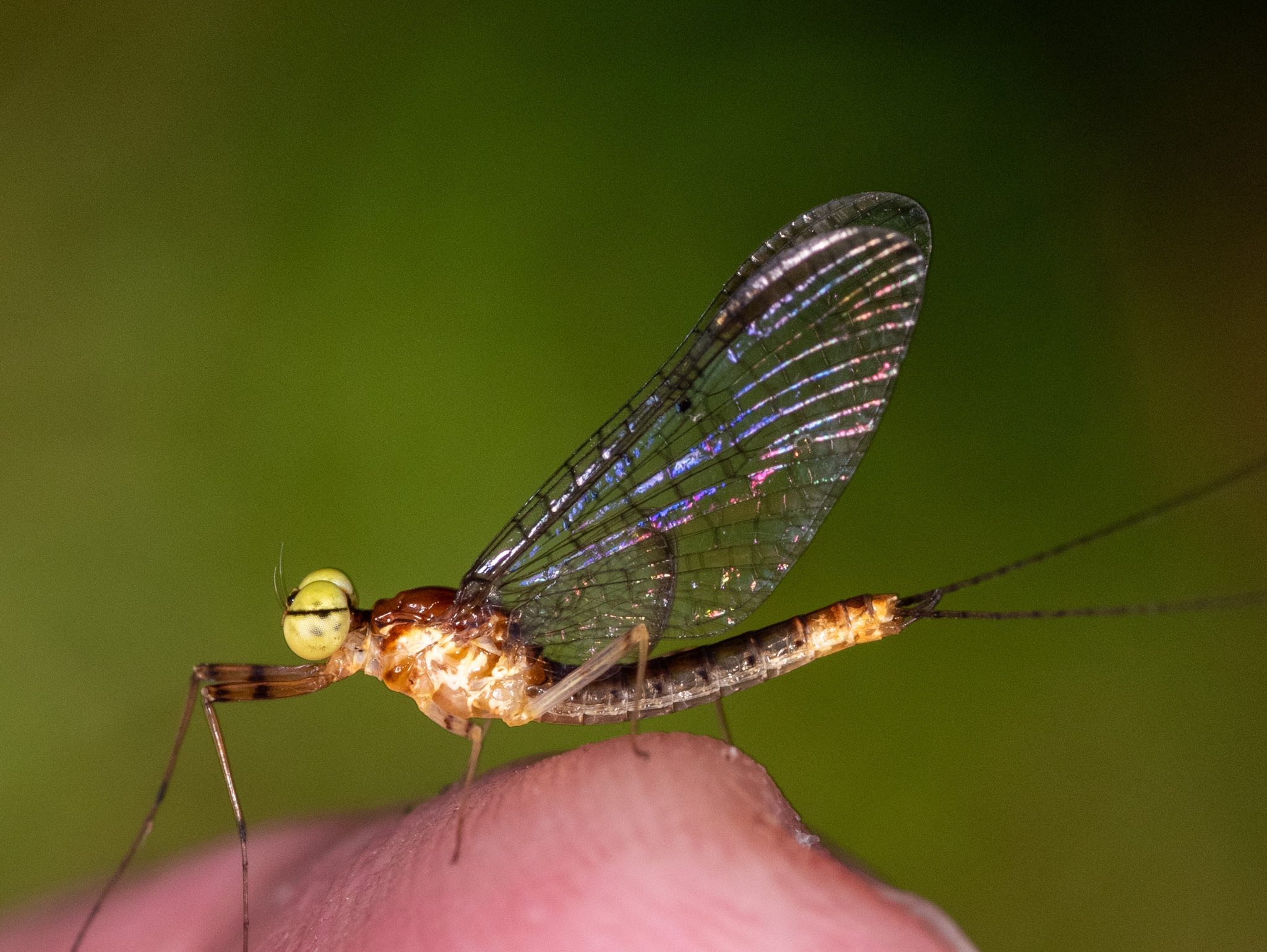

Scientific classification
- Kingdom: Animalia
- Phylum: Arthropoda
- Class: Insecta
- Order: Ephemeroptera
- Family: Heptageniidae
- Genus: Stenacron
- Species: S. minnetonka

Binomial name
- Stenacron minnetonka (Daggy, 1945)

Synonyms
- Stenonema minnetonka Daggy, 1945

= Stenacron minnetonka =

Species of mayfly

Stenacron minnetonka is a species of flatheaded mayfly in the family Heptageniidae. It is found in North America.
