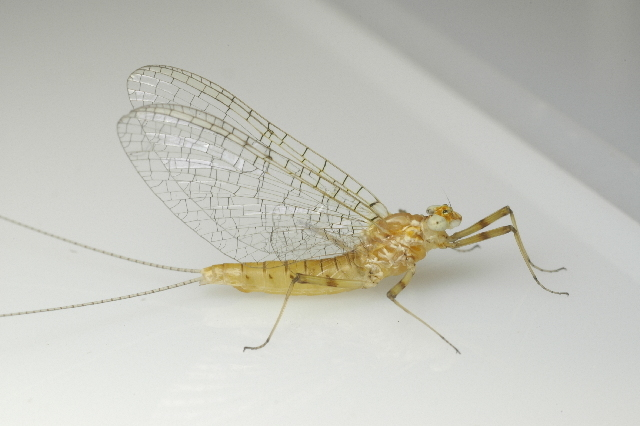

Scientific classification
- Domain: Eukaryota
- Kingdom: Animalia
- Phylum: Arthropoda
- Class: Insecta
- Order: Ephemeroptera
- Family: Heptageniidae
- Genus: Maccaffertium
- Species: M. modestum

Binomial name
- Maccaffertium modestum (Banks, 1910)

Synonyms
- Ecdyonurus ruber McDunnough, 1926; Ecdyonurus rubromaculatus (Clemens, 1913); Epeorus modestus Banks, 1910; Heptagenia rubromaculata Clemens, 1913; Stenonema annexum Traver, 1933; Stenonema ruber (McDunnough, 1926); Stenonema rubromaculatum (Clemens, 1913); Stenonema rubrum (McDunnough, 1926); Stenonema varium Traver, 1933

= Maccaffertium modestum =

Species of mayfly

Maccaffertium modestum is a species of flatheaded mayfly in the family Heptageniidae. It is found in North America.
