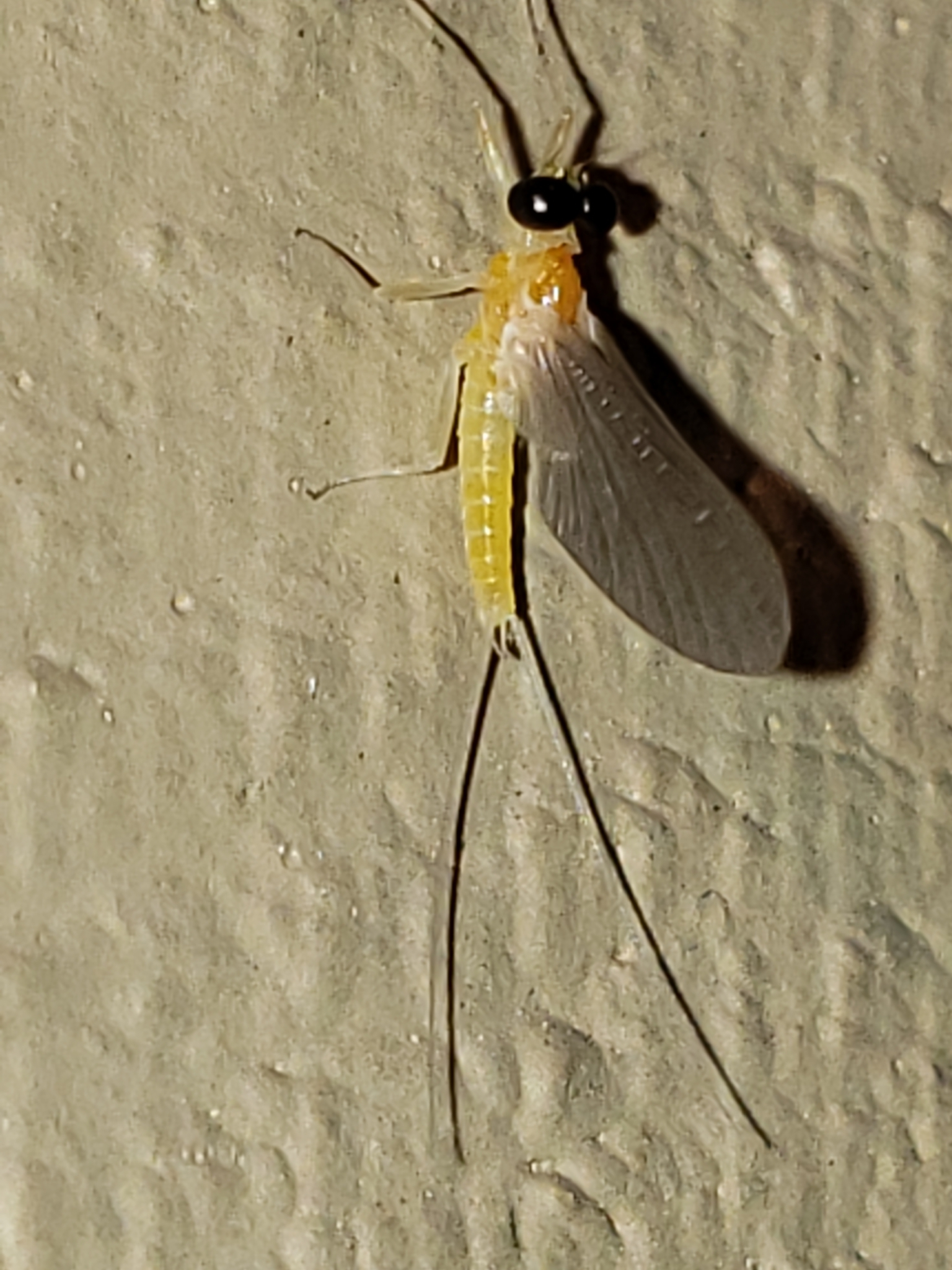

Scientific classification
- Domain: Eukaryota
- Kingdom: Animalia
- Phylum: Arthropoda
- Class: Insecta
- Order: Ephemeroptera
- Family: Heptageniidae
- Genus: Nixe
- Species: N. inconspicua

Binomial name
- Nixe inconspicua (McDunnough, 1924)

Synonyms
- Heptagenia inconspicua McDunnough, 1924

= Nixe inconspicua =

Species of mayfly

Nixe inconspicua is a species of flatheaded mayfly in the family Heptageniidae. It is found in North America.
