= Maccaffertium annae =

Maccaffertium annae Temporal range: Burdigalian

Scientific classification
- Domain: Eukaryota
- Kingdom: Animalia
- Phylum: Arthropoda
- Class: Insecta
- Order: Ephemeroptera
- Family: Heptageniidae
- Genus: Maccaffertium
- Species: †M. annae

Binomial name
- †Maccaffertium annae Macadam & Ross, 2016

Extinct species of mayfly

Macaffertium annae is an extinct species of Maccaffertium that lived during the Burdigalian stage of the Miocene epoch.

== Distribution ==
Macaffertium annae is known from Mexican amber.
