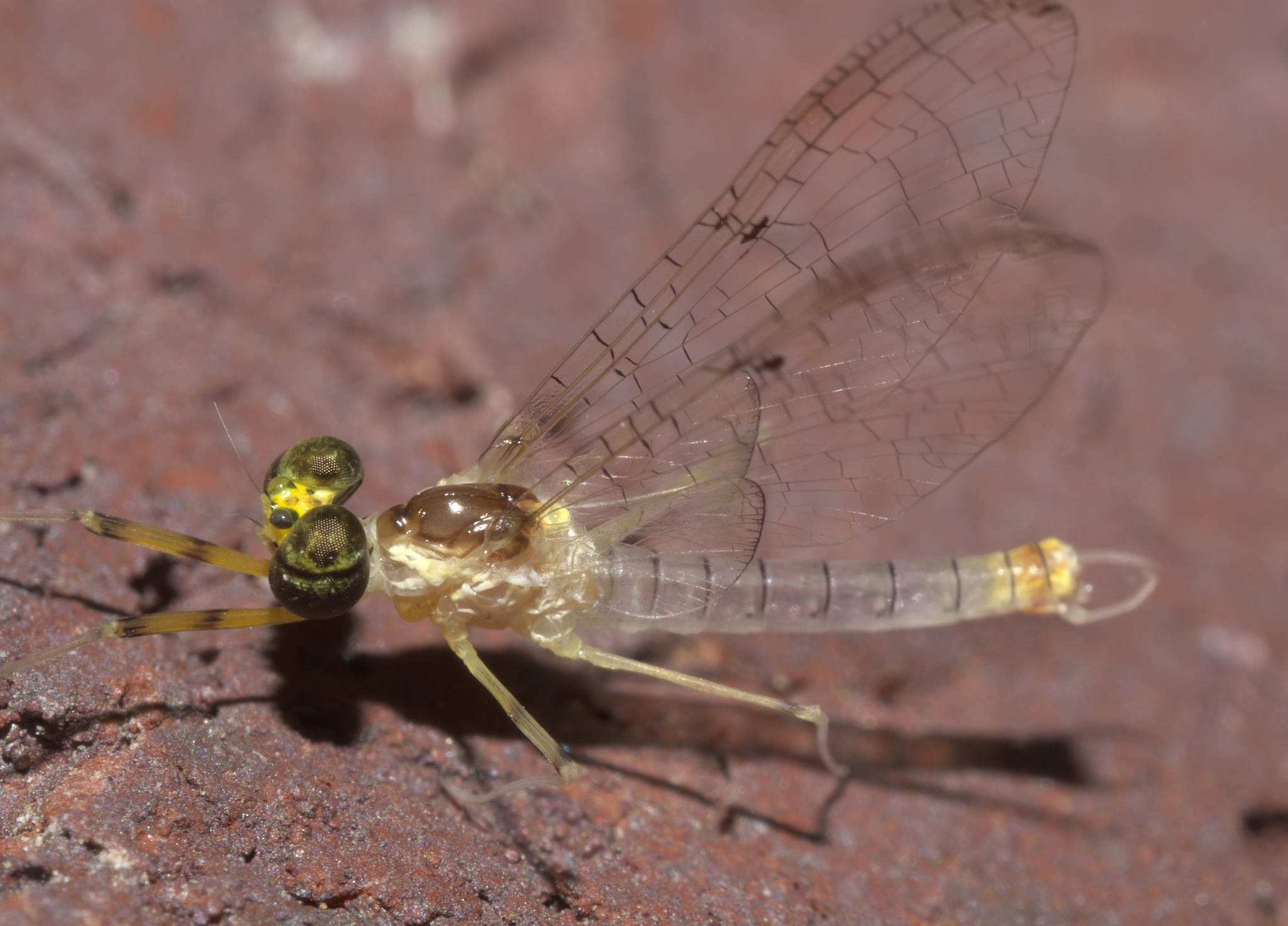
- In Oklahoma, US

Scientific classification
- Kingdom: Animalia
- Phylum: Arthropoda
- Class: Insecta
- Order: Ephemeroptera
- Family: Heptageniidae
- Genus: Stenacron
- Species: S. candidum

Binomial name
- Stenacron candidum (Traver, 1935)

Synonyms
- Stenonema candidum Traver, 1935

= Stenacron candidum =

Species of mayfly

Stenacron candidum is a species of flatheaded mayfly in the family Heptageniidae. It is found in North America.
