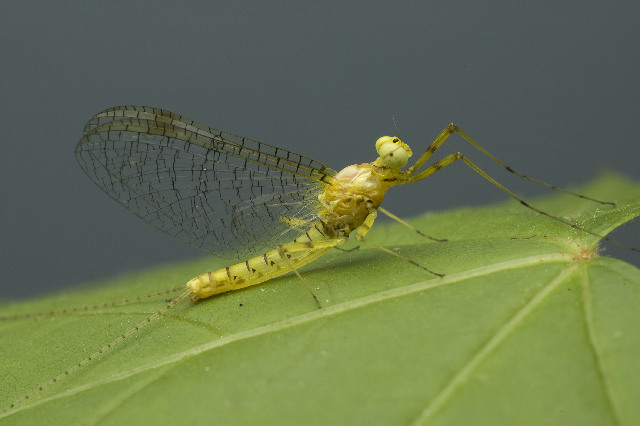

Scientific classification
- Kingdom: Animalia
- Phylum: Arthropoda
- Class: Insecta
- Order: Ephemeroptera
- Family: Heptageniidae
- Genus: Maccaffertium
- Species: M. meririvulanum

Binomial name
- Maccaffertium meririvulanum (Carle & Lewis, 1978)

Synonyms
- Stenonema meririvulanum Carle and Lewis, 1978

= Maccaffertium meririvulanum =

Species of mayfly

Maccaffertium meririvulanum is a species of flatheaded mayfly in the family Heptageniidae. It is found in North America.
