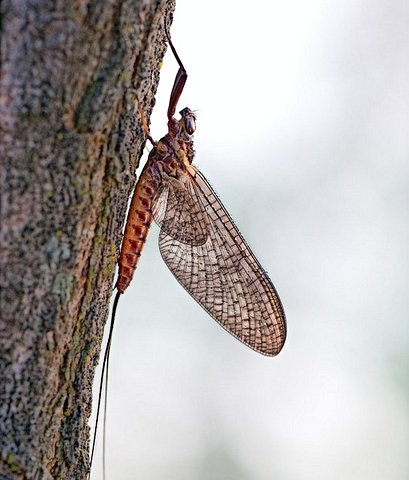
- Ecdyonurus venosus

Scientific classification
- Kingdom: Animalia
- Phylum: Arthropoda
- Class: Insecta
- Order: Ephemeroptera
- Family: Heptageniidae
- Genus: Ecdyonurus; Eaton, 1868

= Ecdyonurus =

Genus of mayflies

Ecdyonurus is a genus of mayflies of the family Heptageniidae.

== Species ==
These 66 species belong to the genus Ecdyonurus:

- Ecdyonurus adjaricus^{g}
- Ecdyonurus alpinus Hefti, Tomka & Zurwerra, 1987^{c g}
- Ecdyonurus androsianus Braasch, 1983^{c g}
- Ecdyonurus angelieri Thomas, 1968^{c g}
- Ecdyonurus asiaeminoris Demoulin, 1973^{c g}
- Ecdyonurus aurantiacus (Burmeister, 1839)^{c g}
- Ecdyonurus austriacus Kimmins, 1958^{c g}
- Ecdyonurus autumnalis Braasch, 1980^{c g}
- Ecdyonurus baeticus Alba-Tercedor & Derka, 2004^{c g}
- Ecdyonurus bajkovae Kluge, 1986^{c g}
- Ecdyonurus belfiorei Haybach & Thomas, 2000^{c g}
- Ecdyonurus bellieri (Hagen, 1860)^{c g}
- Ecdyonurus bellus (Allen and Cohen, 1977)^{i c g}
- Ecdyonurus bimaculatus Tanatmis & Haybach, 2010^{c g}
- Ecdyonurus carpathicus Sowa, 1973^{c g}
- Ecdyonurus codinai Navás, 1924^{c g}
- Ecdyonurus corsicus Esben-Petersen, 1912^{c g}
- Ecdyonurus cortensis Belfiore, 1987^{c g}
- Ecdyonurus criddlei (McDunnough, 1927)^{i c g b} (little slate-winged dun)
- Ecdyonurus dispar (Curtis, 1834)^{c g}
- Ecdyonurus diversus Navas, 1923^{g}
- Ecdyonurus eatoni Kimmins, 1937^{c g}
- Ecdyonurus epeorides Demoulin, 1955^{c g}
- Ecdyonurus excelsus Navas, 1927^{g}
- Ecdyonurus flavimanus Klapalek, 1905^{g}
- Ecdyonurus flavus Takahashi, 1929^{c g}
- Ecdyonurus forcipula (Pictet, 1843)^{c g}
- Ecdyonurus fractus Kang & Yang, 1994^{c g}
- Ecdyonurus fragilis Tiunova, 2006^{c g}
- Ecdyonurus graecus Braasch, 1984^{c g}
- Ecdyonurus groehnorum Godunko, 2007^{g}
- Ecdyonurus helveticus Eaton, 1883^{c g}
- Ecdyonurus ifranensis Vitte & Thomas, 1988^{c g}
- Ecdyonurus insignis (Eaton, 1870)^{c g}
- Ecdyonurus klugei Braasch, 1980^{c g}
- Ecdyonurus krueperi (Stein, 1863)^{c g}
- Ecdyonurus macani Thomas & Sowa, 1970^{c g}
- Ecdyonurus moreae Belfiore & Braasch, 1986^{c g}
- Ecdyonurus muelleri Braasch, 1980^{c g}
- Ecdyonurus naraensis Gose, 1968^{c g}
- Ecdyonurus nigrescens (Klapálek, 1908)^{c g}
- Ecdyonurus olgae Alba-Tercedor & Derka, 2004^{c g}
- Ecdyonurus ornatipennis Tshernova, 1938^{c g}
- Ecdyonurus pallidus Braasch & Soldán, 1982^{c g}
- Ecdyonurus parahelveticus Hefti, Tomka & Zurwerra, 1986^{c g}
- Ecdyonurus picteti (Meyer-Dür, 1864)^{c g}
- Ecdyonurus puma Jacob & Braasch, 1986^{c g}
- Ecdyonurus rizuni Godunko, Klonowska-Olejnik & Soldán, 2004^{c g}
- Ecdyonurus rothschildi Navás, 1929^{c g}
- Ecdyonurus rubrofasciatus Brodsky, 1930^{c g}
- Ecdyonurus ruffii Grandi, 1953^{c g}
- Ecdyonurus russevi Braasch & Soldán, 1985^{c g}
- Ecdyonurus silvaegabretae Soldán & Godunko, 2006^{c g}
- Ecdyonurus simplicioides (McDunnough, 1924)^{i c g}
- Ecdyonurus siveci Jacob & Braasch, 1984^{c g}
- Ecdyonurus solus Prokopov & Godunko, 2007^{c g}
- Ecdyonurus starmachi Sowa, 1971^{c g}
- Ecdyonurus subalpinus (Klapálek, 1907)^{c g}
- Ecdyonurus submontanus Landa, 1970^{c g}
- Ecdyonurus taipokauensis (Tong & Dudgeon, 2003)^{c}
- Ecdyonurus tonkinensis (Soldán & Braasch, 1986)^{c g}
- Ecdyonurus torrentis Kimmins, 1942^{c g}
- Ecdyonurus venosus (Fabricius, 1775)^{c g}
- Ecdyonurus vicinus (Demoulin, 1964)^{c g}
- Ecdyonurus vitoshensis Jacob & Braasch, 1984^{c g}
- Ecdyonurus zelleri (Eaton, 1885)^{c g}

Data sources: i = ITIS, c = Catalogue of Life, g = GBIF, b = Bugguide.net
