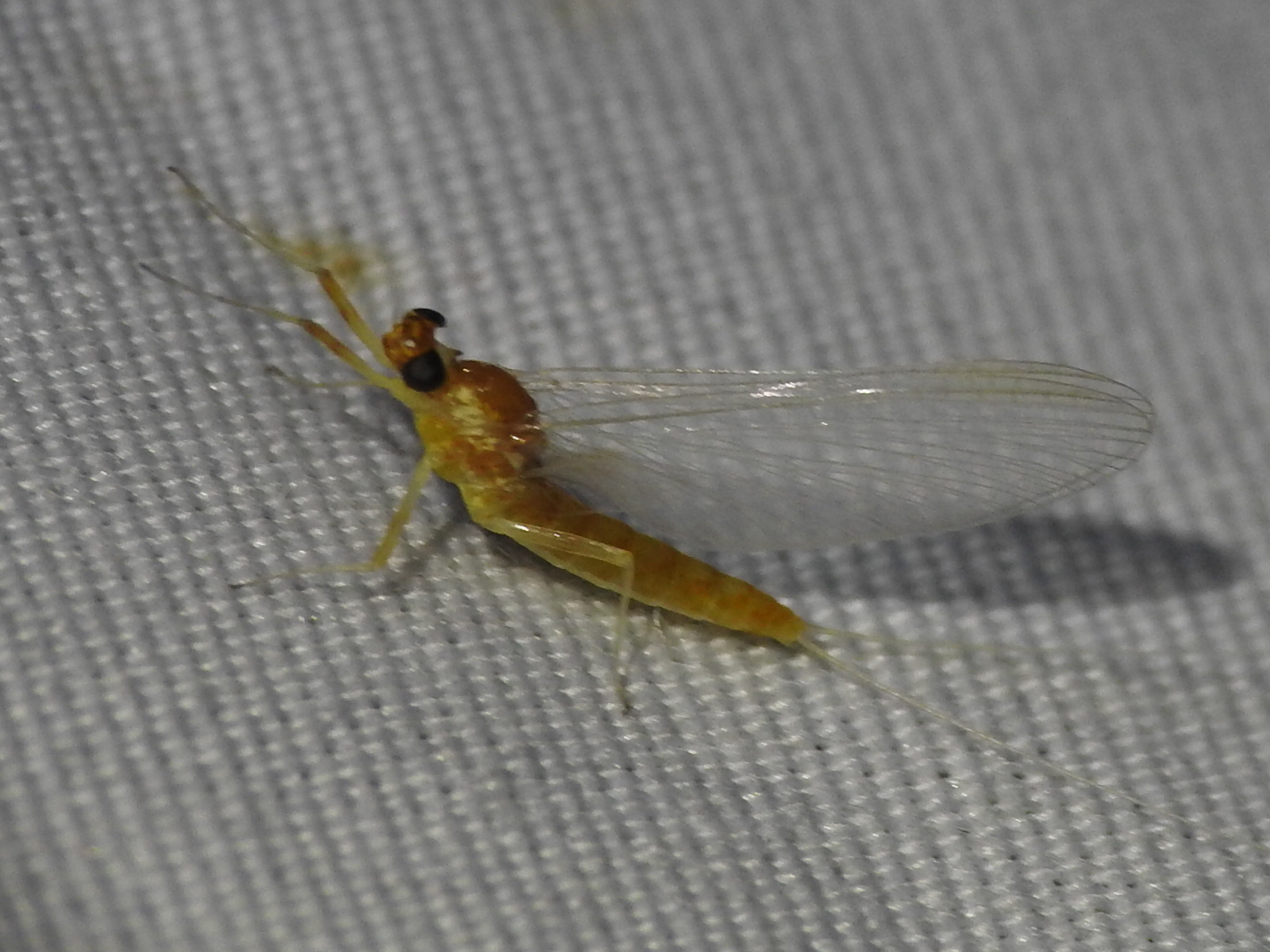
- Nixe rusticalis

Scientific classification
- Kingdom: Animalia
- Phylum: Arthropoda
- Clade: Pancrustacea
- Class: Insecta
- Order: Ephemeroptera
- Family: Heptageniidae
- Genus: Nixe; Flowers, 1980

= Nixe (mayfly) =

Genus of mayflies

Nixe is a genus of mayflies in the family Heptageniidae.

== Species ==
- Nixe dorothae
- Nixe flowersi
- Nixe horrida
- Nixe inconspicua
- Nixe kennedyi
- Nixe lucidipennis
- Nixe perfida
- Nixe rusticalis
- Nixe spinosa
