= Kageronia =

Scientific classification
- Kingdom: Animalia
- Phylum: Arthropoda
- Clade: Pancrustacea
- Class: Insecta
- Order: Ephemeroptera
- Family: Heptageniidae
- Genus: Kageronia; Matsumura, 1931

Genus of mayflies

Kageronia is a genus of mayflies in the family Heptageniidae.
