= Anepeorus =

Scientific classification
- Domain: Eukaryota
- Kingdom: Animalia
- Phylum: Arthropoda
- Class: Insecta
- Order: Ephemeroptera
- Family: Heptageniidae
- Genus: Anepeorus; McDunnough, 1925

Genus of mayflies

Anepeorus is a genus of mayflies in the family Heptageniidae.
