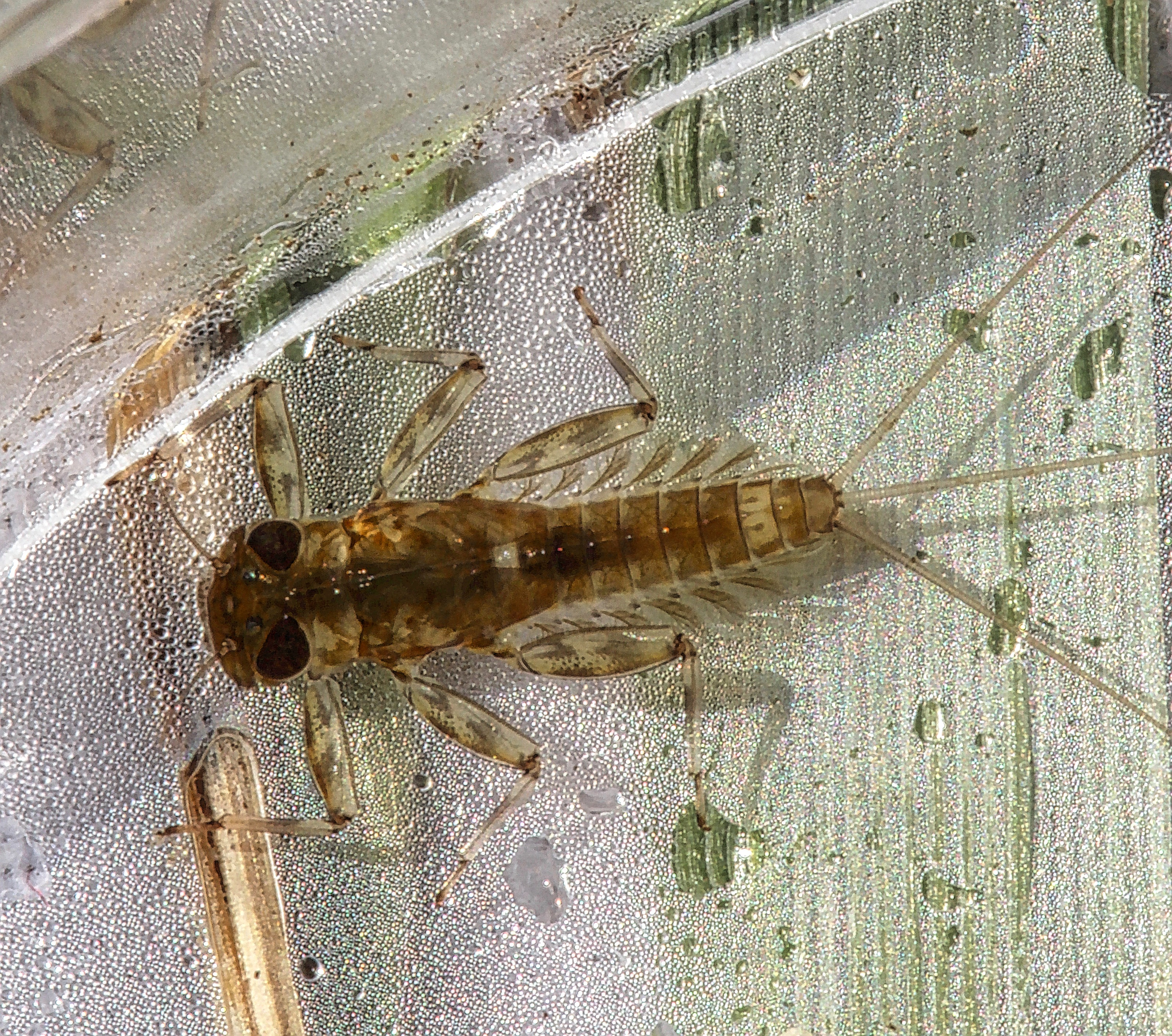
- Cinygmula

Scientific classification
- Domain: Eukaryota
- Kingdom: Animalia
- Phylum: Arthropoda
- Class: Insecta
- Order: Ephemeroptera
- Family: Heptageniidae
- Genus: Cinygmula; McDunnough, 1933

= Cinygmula =

Genus of mayflies

Cinygmula is a genus of flatheaded mayflies in the family Heptageniidae. There are at least 30 described species in Cinygmula.

== Species ==
These 33 species belong to the genus Cinygmula:

- Cinygmula adusta Imanishi, 1935^{c g}
- Cinygmula brunnea Tiunova, 1990^{c g}
- Cinygmula cava Ulmer, 1927^{c g}
- Cinygmula dorsalis Imanishi, 1935^{c g}
- Cinygmula gartrelli McDunnough, 1934^{i c g}
- Cinygmula hirasana Imanishi, 1935^{c g}
- Cinygmula hutchinsoni Traver, 1939^{c g}
- Cinygmula inermis Braasch, 1983^{c g}
- Cinygmula irina Tshernova & Belov, 1982^{c g}
- Cinygmula joosti Braasch, 1977^{c g}
- Cinygmula kootenai McDunnough, 1943^{i c g}
- Cinygmula kurenzovi Bajkova, 1965^{c g}
- Cinygmula levanidovi Tshernova & Belov, 1982^{c g}
- Cinygmula malaisei Ulmer, 1927^{c g}
- Cinygmula mimus Eaton, 1885^{i c g}
- Cinygmula minuta Braasch, 1980^{c g}
- Cinygmula oreophila Kustareva, 1978^{c g}
- Cinygmula par Eaton, 1885^{i c g}
- Cinygmula picta Braasch & Soldán, 1979^{c g}
- Cinygmula putoranica Kluge, 1980^{c g}
- Cinygmula quadripunctata Braasch & Soldán, 1980^{c g}
- Cinygmula ramaleyi Dodds, 1923^{i c g}
- Cinygmula reticulata McDunnough, 1934^{i c g}
- Cinygmula rougemonti Braasch & Soldán, 1987^{c g}
- Cinygmula sapporensis Matsumura, 1904^{c g}
- Cinygmula subaequalis Banks, 1914^{i c g b}
- Cinygmula tarda McDunnough, 1929^{i c g}
- Cinygmula tetramera^{g}
- Cinygmula tioga Mayo, 1952^{i c g}
- Cinygmula unicolorata Tshernova, 1979^{c g}
- Cinygmula uniformis McDunnough, 1934^{i c g}
- Cinygmula vernalis Imanishi, 1935^{c g}
- Cinygmula zimmermanni Braasch, 1977^{c g}

Data sources: i = ITIS, c = Catalogue of Life, g = GBIF, b = Bugguide.net
