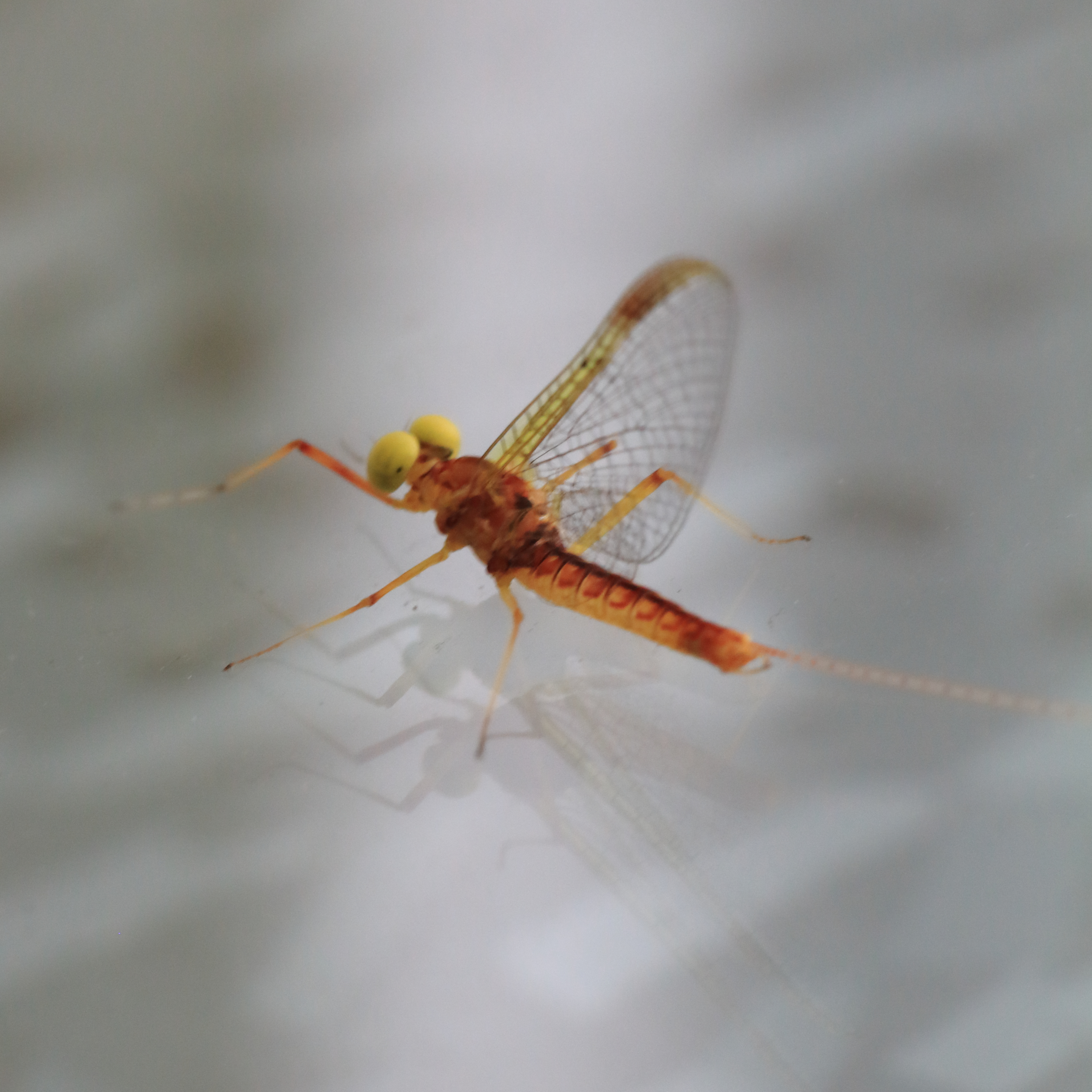
- Heptagenia flava

Scientific classification
- Domain: Eukaryota
- Kingdom: Animalia
- Phylum: Arthropoda
- Class: Insecta
- Order: Ephemeroptera
- Family: Heptageniidae
- Genus: Heptagenia; Walsh, 1863

= Heptagenia =

Genus of mayflies

Heptagenia is a genus of flatheaded mayflies in the family Heptageniidae. There are at least 20 described species in Heptagenia.

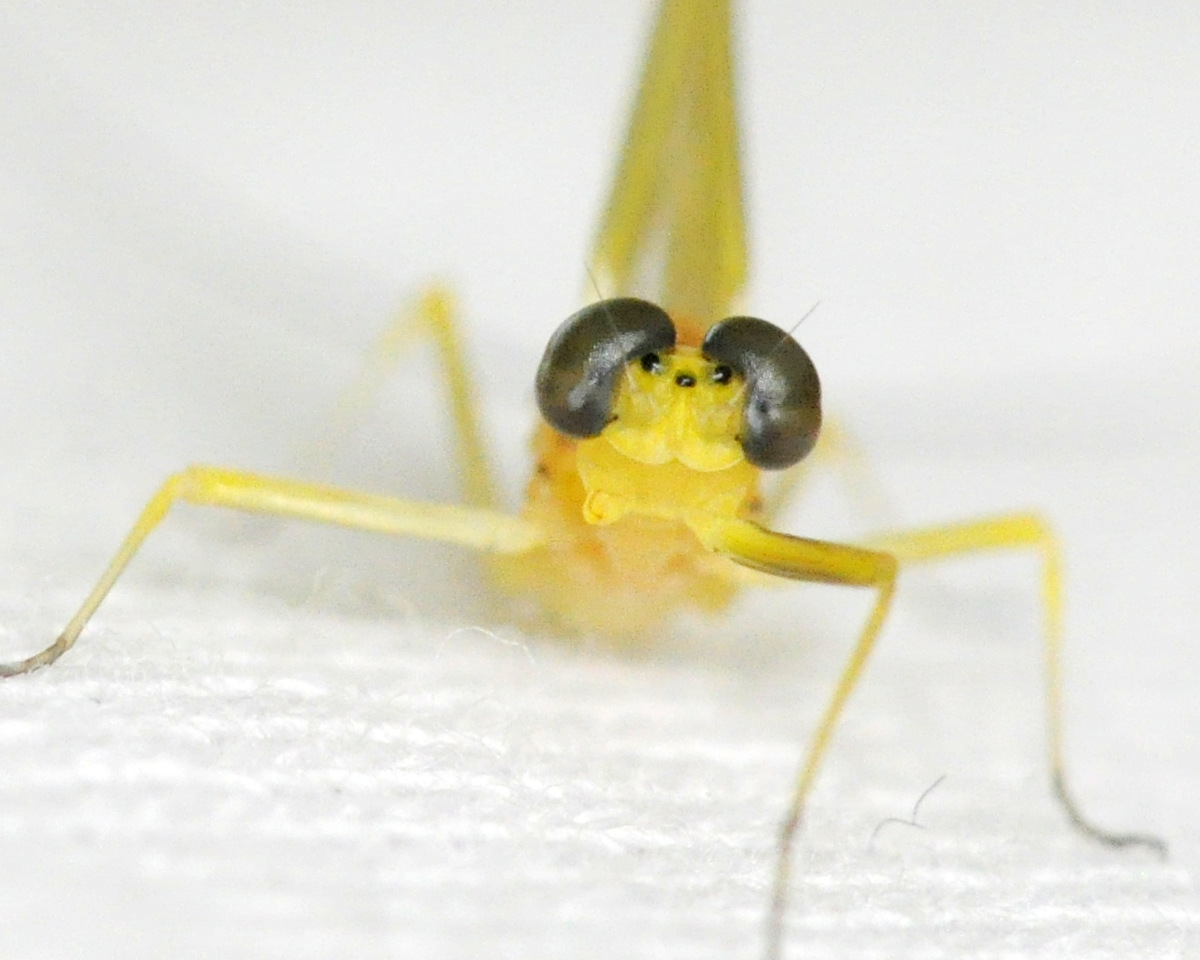
Heptagenia sulphurea

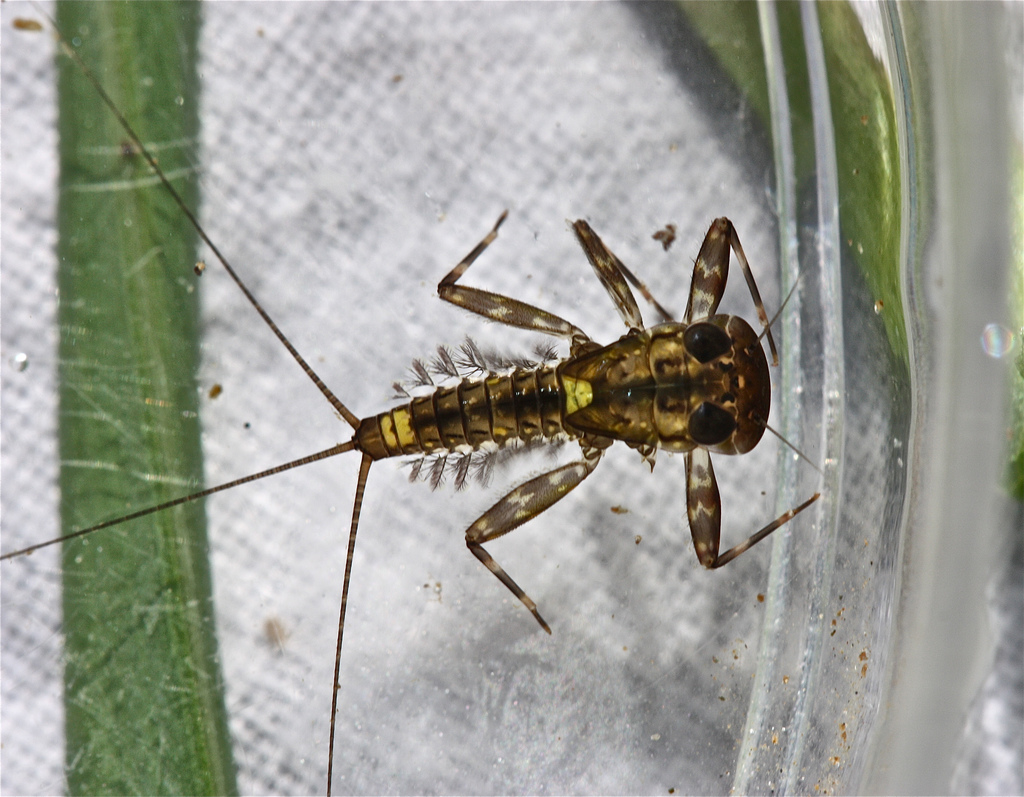

== Species ==
These 27 species belong to the genus Heptagenia:

- Heptagenia adaequata McDunnough, 1924^{i c g}
- Heptagenia chinensis Ulmer, 1920^{c g}
- Heptagenia culacantha Evans, Botts and Flowers, 1985^{i c g}
- Heptagenia dalecarlica Bengtsson, 1912^{c g}
- Heptagenia dolosa Traver, 1935^{i c g}
- Heptagenia elegantula (Eaton, 1885)^{i c g b}
- Heptagenia flava Rostock, 1878^{c g}
- Heptagenia flavata Navás, 1922^{c g}
- Heptagenia flavescens (Walsh, 1862)^{i c g b}
- Heptagenia guranica Belov, 1981^{c g}
- Heptagenia joernensis^{g}
- Heptagenia julia Traver, 1933^{i c g}
- Heptagenia kyotoensis Gose, 1963^{c g}
- Heptagenia longicauda (Stephens, 1836)^{c g}
- Heptagenia marginalis Banks, 1910^{i c g b}
- Heptagenia nubila Kimmins, 1937^{c g}
- Heptagenia patoka Burks, 1946^{i c g}
- Heptagenia pectoralis Matsumura, 1931^{c g}
- Heptagenia perflava Brodsky, 1930^{c g}
- Heptagenia pulla (Clemens, 1913)^{i c g}
- Heptagenia quadripunctata Kluge, 1989^{c g}
- Heptagenia samochai (Demoulin, 1973)^{c g}
- Heptagenia solitaria McDunnough, 1924^{i c g b}
- Heptagenia sulphurea (Müller, 1776)^{c g}
- Heptagenia townesi Traver, 1935^{i c g}
- Heptagenia traverae Braasch, 1986^{c g}
- Heptagenia whitingi Webb and McCafferty in Webb, Sun, McCafferty and Ferris, 2007^{i c g}

Data sources: i = ITIS, c = Catalogue of Life, g = GBIF, b = Bugguide.net
