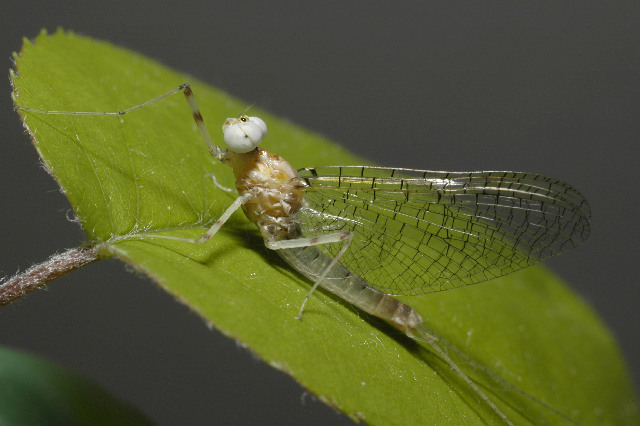
- Maccaffertium lenati

Scientific classification
- Domain: Eukaryota
- Kingdom: Animalia
- Phylum: Arthropoda
- Class: Insecta
- Order: Ephemeroptera
- Family: Heptageniidae
- Genus: Maccaffertium; Bednarik, 1979

= Maccaffertium =

Genus of mayflies

Maccaffertium is a genus of flatheaded mayflies in the family Heptageniidae. There are at least 20 described species in Maccaffertium.

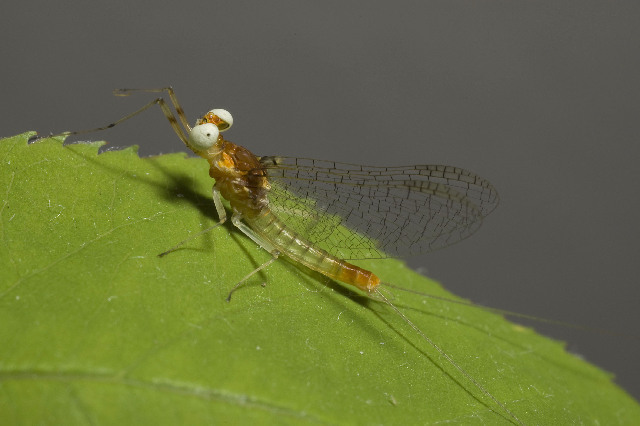
Maccaffertium terminatum

== Species ==
These 20 species belong to the genus Maccaffertium:

- Maccaffertium appaloosa (McCafferty, 2011)
- Maccaffertium bednariki (McCafferty, 1981)
- Maccaffertium carlsoni (Lewis, 1974)
- Maccaffertium exiguum (Traver, 1933)
- Maccaffertium flaveolum (Pictet, 1843)
- Maccaffertium ithaca (Clemens & Leonard, 1924)
- Maccaffertium lenati (McCafferty, 1990)
- Maccaffertium luteum (Clemens, 1913)
- Maccaffertium mediopunctatum (McDunnough, 1926)
- Maccaffertium meririvulanum (Carle & Lewis, 1978)
- Maccaffertium mexicanum (Ulmer, 1920)
- Maccaffertium modestum (Banks, 1910)
- Maccaffertium pudicum (Hagen, 1861)
- Maccaffertium pulchellum (Walsh, 1862)
- Maccaffertium sinclairi (Lewis, 1979)
- Maccaffertium smithae (Traver, 1937)
- Maccaffertium terminatum (Walsh, 1862)
- Maccaffertium vicarium (Walker, 1853)
- Maccaffertium wudigeum McCafferty & Lenat, 2010
- † Maccaffertium annae Macadam & Ross, 2016
