= Asionurus =

Scientific classification
- Domain: Eukaryota
- Kingdom: Animalia
- Phylum: Arthropoda
- Class: Insecta
- Order: Ephemeroptera
- Family: Heptageniidae
- Genus: Asionurus; Braasch & Soldán, 1986

Genus of mayflies

Asionurus is a genus of mayflies in the family Heptageniidae.

== Species ==
There are three scientifically recognized species in the genus Asionurus:

- Asionurus petersi Braasch & Soldán, 1987
- Asionurus primus Braasch & Soldán, 1986
- Asionurus ulmeri Braasch & Soldán, 1986
