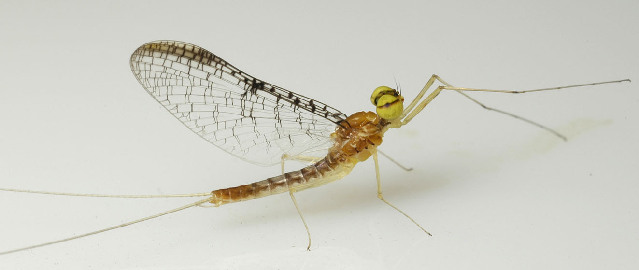
- Leucrocuta aphrodite

Scientific classification
- Kingdom: Animalia
- Phylum: Arthropoda
- Clade: Pancrustacea
- Class: Insecta
- Order: Ephemeroptera
- Family: Heptageniidae
- Genus: Leucrocuta; Flowers, 1980

= Leucrocuta =

Genus of mayflies

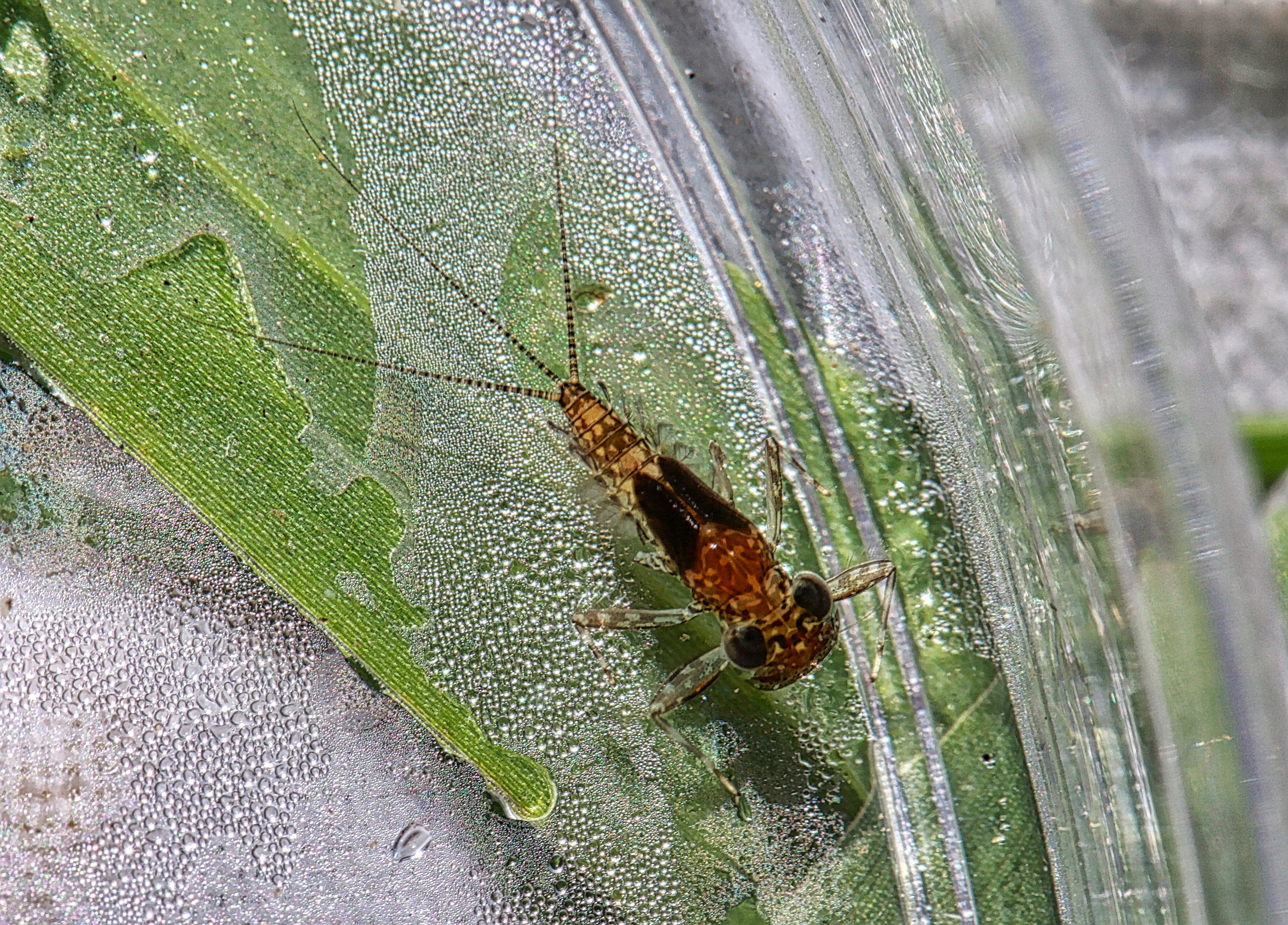
Leucrocuta hebe

Leucrocuta is a genus of mayflies in the family Heptageniidae.

== Species ==
These 10 species belong to the genus Leucrocuta:

- Leucrocuta aphrodite (McDunnough, 1926)^{i c g b}
- Leucrocuta hebe (McDunnough, 1924)^{i c g b}
- Leucrocuta jewetti (Allen, 1966)^{i c g b}
- Leucrocuta juno (McDunnough, 1924)^{i c g b}
- Leucrocuta maculipennis (Walsh, 1863)^{i c g b}
- Leucrocuta minerva (McDunnough, 1924)^{i c g}
- Leucrocuta petersi (Allen, 1966)^{i c g b}
- Leucrocuta thetis (Traver, 1935)^{i c g b}
- Leucrocuta umbratica (McDunnough, 1931)^{i c g}
- Leucrocuta walshi (McDunnough, 1926)^{i c g b}

Data source: i = ITIS, c = Catalogue of Life, g = GBIF, b = Bugguide.net
