= Bleptus =

Scientific classification
- Domain: Eukaryota
- Kingdom: Animalia
- Phylum: Arthropoda
- Class: Insecta
- Order: Ephemeroptera
- Family: Heptageniidae
- Genus: Bleptus; Eaton, 1885

Genus of mayflies

Bleptus is a genus of mayfly under the family Heptageniidae. It contains two species: Bleptus fasciatus (Eaton, 1885) and Bleptus michinokuensis (Toyo & Miyairi, 2021).
