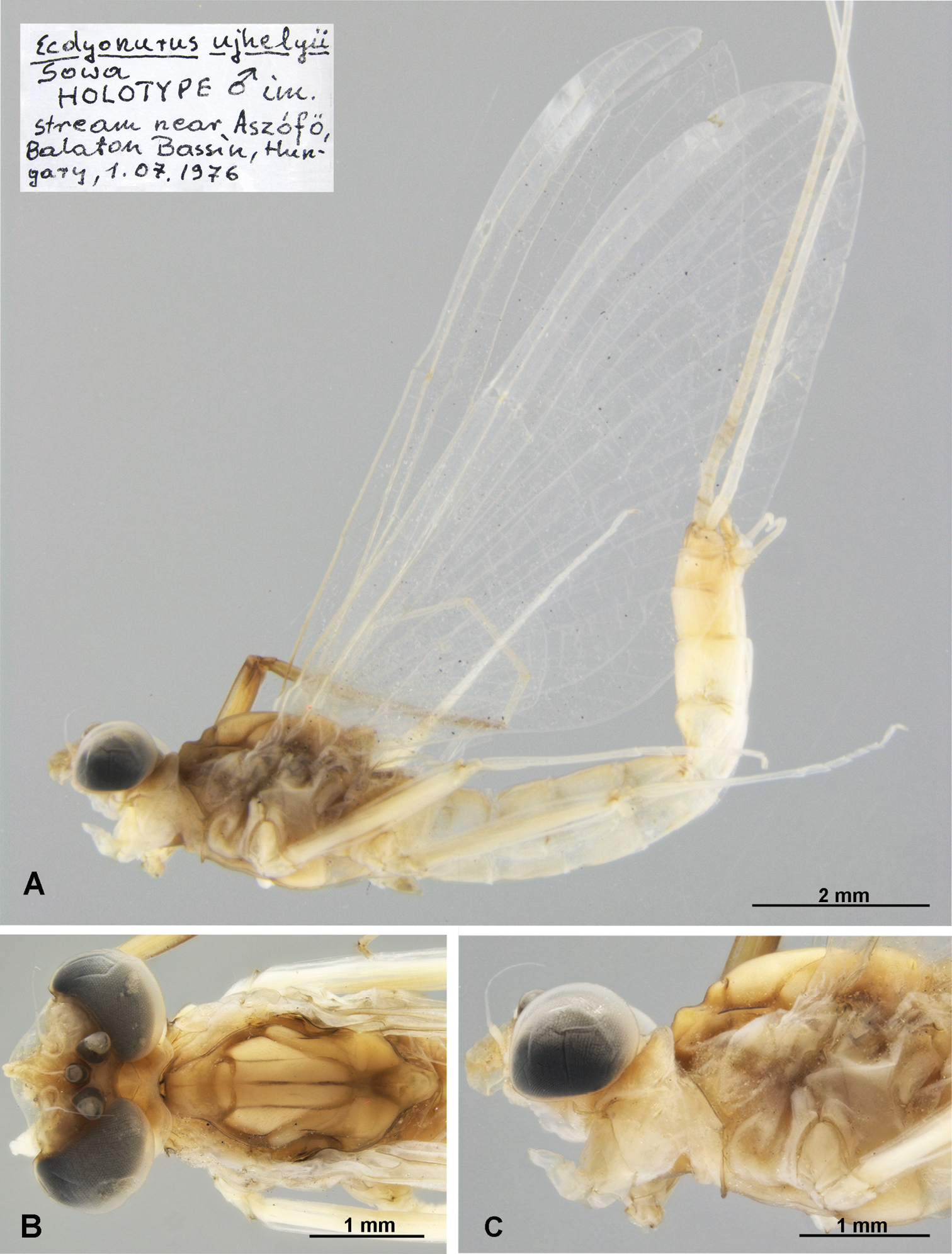
- Electrogena ujhelyii

Scientific classification
- Domain: Eukaryota
- Kingdom: Animalia
- Phylum: Arthropoda
- Class: Insecta
- Order: Ephemeroptera
- Family: Heptageniidae
- Genus: Electrogena; Zurwerra & Tomka, 1985

= Electrogena =

Genus of mayflies

Electrogena is a genus of mayflies in the family Heptageniidae.

== Species ==
There are 45 scientifically accepted species in the genus Electrogena:

- Electrogena affinis Eaton, 1886
- Electrogena anatolica Kazanci & Braasch, 1986
- Electrogena antalyensis Kazanci & Braasch, 1986
- Electrogena apicata Braasch, 1984
- Electrogena armeniaca Braasch, 1983
- Electrogena aspoecki Braasch, 1984
- Electrogena azerbajdshanica Braasch, 1978
- Electrogena bilineata Braasch, 1984
- Electrogena boluensis Kazanci, 1990
- Electrogena bothmeri Braasch, 1983
- Electrogena braaschi Sowa, 1984
- Electrogena calabra Belfiore, 1995
- Electrogena dirmil Kazanci, 1990
- Electrogena fallax Hagen, 1864
- Electrogena galileae Demoulin, 1973
- Electrogena gibedede Godunko & Sroka, 2012
- Electrogena grandiae Belfiore, 1984
- Electrogena gridelli Grandi, 1953
- Electrogena hakkarica Kazanci, 1986
- Electrogena hellenica Zurwerra & Tomka, 1986
- Electrogena hyblaea Belfiore, 1994
- Electrogena kugleri Demoulin, 1973
- Electrogena kuraensis Braasch, 1978
- Electrogena lateralis Curtis, 1834
- Electrogena lunaris Belfiore & Scillitani, 1997
- Electrogena macedonica Ikonomov, 1954
- Electrogena madli Kazanci, 1992
- Electrogena malickyi Braasch, 1983
- Electrogena meyi Braasch, 1980
- Electrogena monticola Braasch, 1980
- Electrogena necatii Kazanci, 1987
- Electrogena ozrensis Tanasijevic, 1975
- Electrogena pakistanica Braasch, 1984
- Electrogena pseudaffinis Braasch, 1980
- Electrogena quadrilineata Landa, 1970
- Electrogena ressli Braasch, 1981
- Electrogena signata Braasch, 1984
- Electrogena squamata Braasch, 1978
- Electrogena trimaculata Ikonomov, 1963
- Electrogena ujhelyii Sowa, 1981
- Electrogena vipavensis Zurwerra & Tomka, 1986
- Electrogena wittmeri Braasch, 1981
- Electrogena zebrata Hagen, 1864
- Electrogena zimmermanni Sowa, 1984
