= Darthus =

Scientific classification
- Domain: Eukaryota
- Kingdom: Animalia
- Phylum: Arthropoda
- Class: Insecta
- Order: Ephemeroptera
- Family: Heptageniidae
- Genus: Darthus; Webb & McCafferty, 2007

Genus of mayflies

Darthus is a genus of mayflies in the family Heptageniidae.
