= Burshtynogena =

Scientific classification
- Domain: Eukaryota
- Kingdom: Animalia
- Phylum: Arthropoda
- Class: Insecta
- Order: Ephemeroptera
- Family: Heptageniidae
- Genus: †Burshtynogena; Godunka & Sontag, 2004
- Species: †B. fereci

Binomial name
- †Burshtynogena fereci Godunka & Sontag, 2004

Genus of mayflies

Burshtynogena is a genus of mayflies in the family Heptageniidae. It contains the single species Burshtynogena fereci.
