= Cinygma =

Scientific classification
- Domain: Eukaryota
- Kingdom: Animalia
- Phylum: Arthropoda
- Class: Insecta
- Order: Ephemeroptera
- Family: Heptageniidae
- Genus: Cinygma; Eaton, 1885

Genus of mayflies

Cinygma is a genus of mayflies in the family Heptageniidae. Nymphs move sluggishly and are poor swimmers, nearly always clinging to wood or rocks.
