= Acanthomola =

Scientific classification
- Kingdom: Animalia
- Phylum: Arthropoda
- Class: Insecta
- Order: Ephemeroptera
- Family: Heptageniidae
- Genus: Acanthomola; Whiting and Lehmkuhl, 1987

Genus of mayflies

Acanthomola is a genus of mayflies in the family Heptageniidae.
