= Atopopus =

Scientific classification
- Domain: Eukaryota
- Kingdom: Animalia
- Phylum: Arthropoda
- Class: Insecta
- Order: Ephemeroptera
- Family: Heptageniidae
- Genus: Atopopus; Eaton, 1881

Genus of mayfly

Atopopus is a genus of mayfly under the family Heptageniidae. Species of this genera usually have brown staining near the edges of their forewings and hindwings.

== Species ==
This genus contains four species:

- Atopopus edmundsi Wang & McCafferty, 1995
- Atopopus meyi Braasch, 2005
- Atopopus tarsalis Eaton, 1881
- Atopopus tibialis Ulmer, 1920
