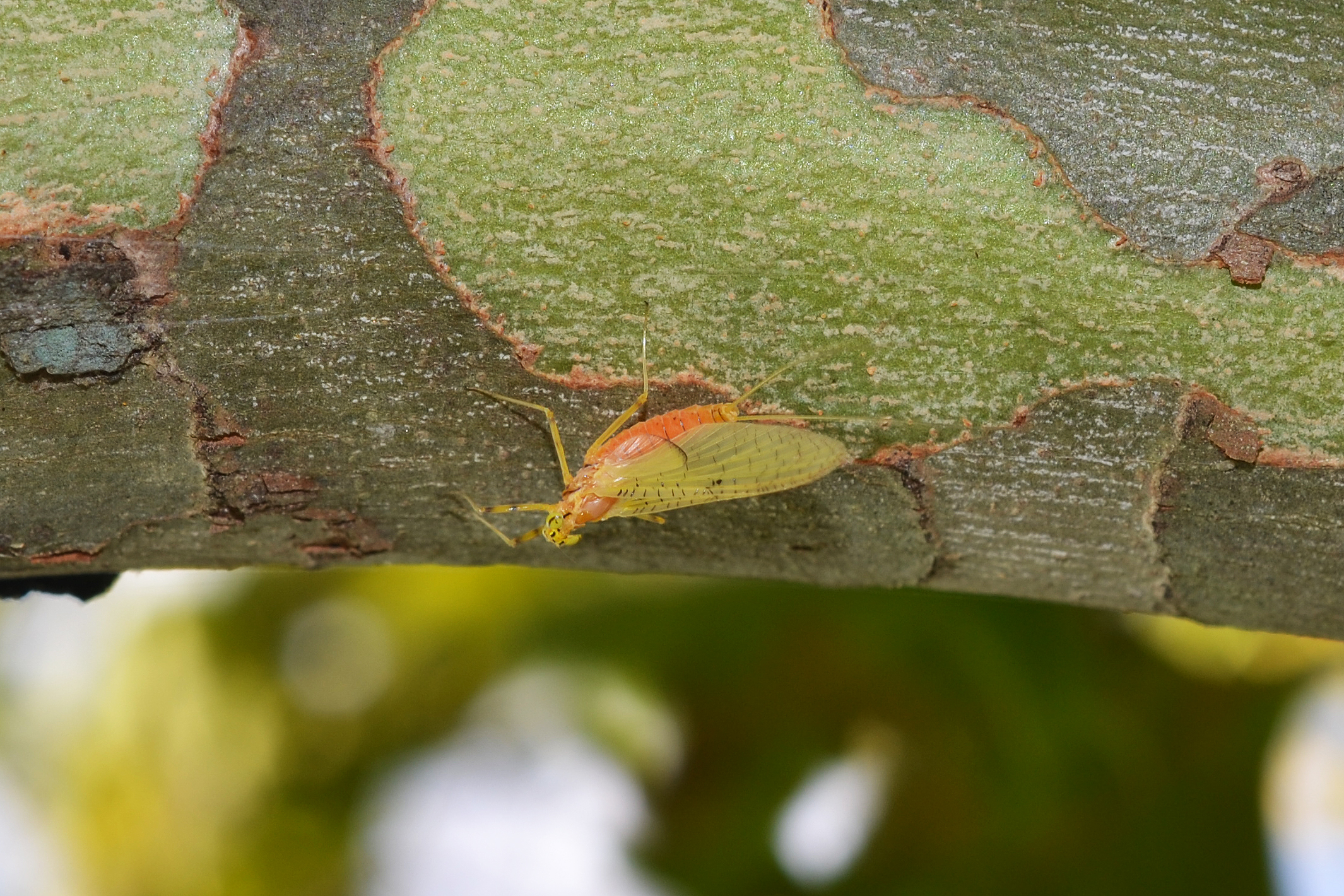
- Stenacron interpunctatum

Scientific classification
- Domain: Eukaryota
- Kingdom: Animalia
- Phylum: Arthropoda
- Class: Insecta
- Order: Ephemeroptera
- Family: Heptageniidae
- Genus: Stenacron; Jensen, 1974

= Stenacron =

Genus of mayflies

Stenacron is a genus of mayfly in the family Heptageniidae (the flat-headed mayflies), with a distribution across eastern North America.

== Habitat ==
Larvae can survive in most shallow freshwater environments, including stagnant, low oxygen, and polluted waters, however they prefer the shallow, slow moving edges of rivers where they cling to the underside of rocks.

== Taxonomy ==
=== History ===
Thomas Say first documented the species interpunctatum in 1839 in Indiana from 20 holotypes and 14 paratypes. Hagen, in 1861, confirmed and expanded the geographical range of the species with a collection of other specimens from Virginia that concurred with Say’s haplotypes. In 1974, the interpunctatum group was listed by Steven L Jensen as the genus Stenacron.

=== Species ===
Although there are 7 recognized species in the genus, the variation amongst populations of S. interpunctatum forms the Stenacron interpunctatum complex, which comprises 16 closely related subspecies.

List of the currently valid species as of 2014:

- Stenacron candidum (Traver, 1935)^{i c g b}
- Stenacron carolina (Banks, 1914)^{i c g b}
- Stenacron floridense (Lewis, 1974)^{i c g b}
- Stenacron gildersleevei (Traver, 1935)^{i c g b} (Gildersleeve's Stenacron Mayfly)
- Stenacron interpunctatum (Say, 1839)^{i c g b} (Stenacron Mayfly)
- Stenacron minnetonka (Daggy, 1945)^{i c g b}
- Stenacron pallidum (Traver, 1933)^{i c g b}

Data sources: i = ITIS, c = Catalogue of Life, g = GBIF, b = Bugguide.net

Synonym forms that make up the interpunctatum complex.

- Stenacron interpunctatum / affine
- Stenacron interpunctatum / areion
- Stenacron interpunctatum / canadense
- Stenacron interpunctatum / conjunctum
- Stenacron interpunctatum / frontale
- Stenacron interpunctatum / heterotarsale
- Stenacron interpunctatum / majus
- Stenacron interpunctatum / ohioense
- Stenacron interpunctatum / proximum
