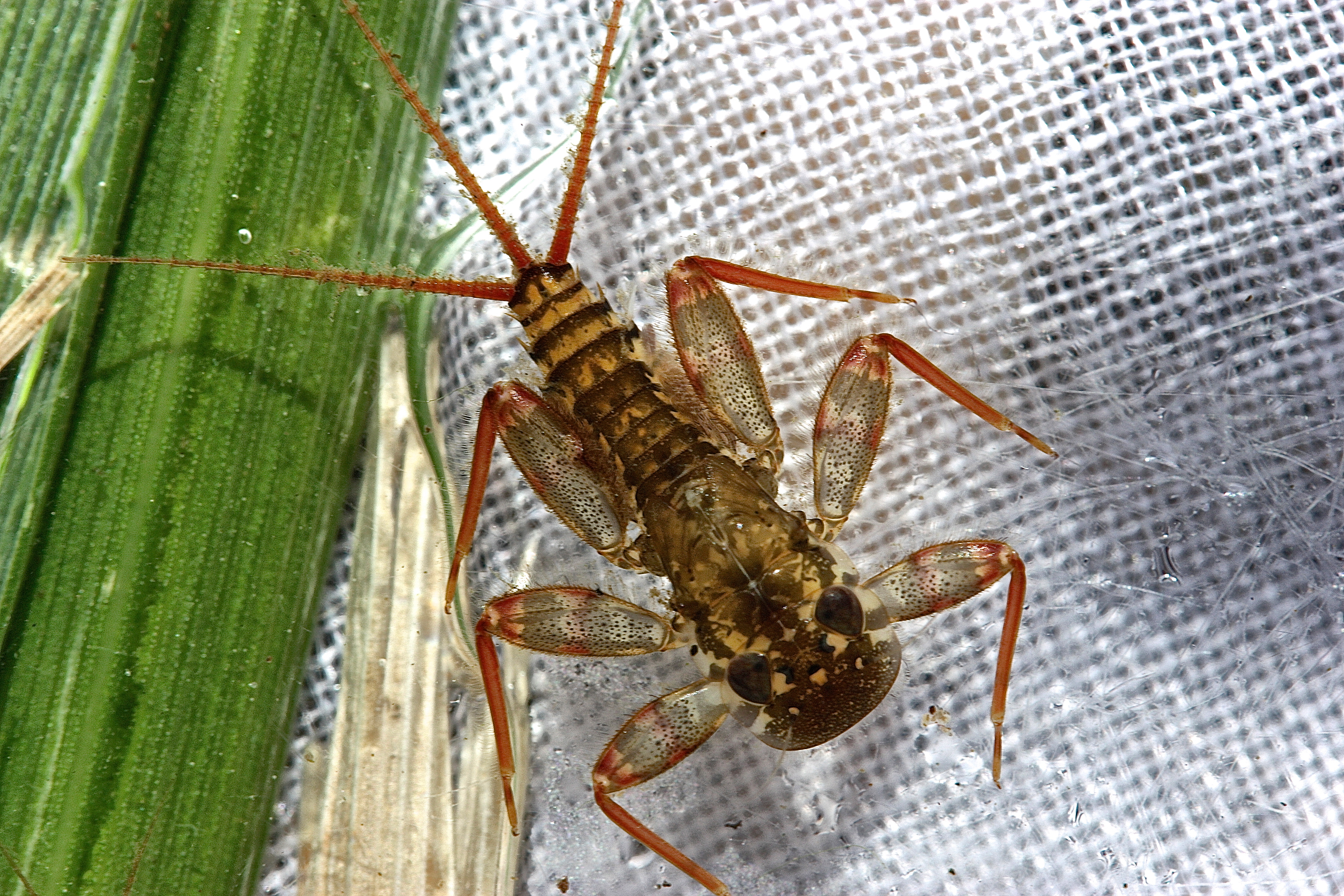

Scientific classification
- Domain: Eukaryota
- Kingdom: Animalia
- Phylum: Arthropoda
- Class: Insecta
- Order: Ephemeroptera
- Family: Heptageniidae
- Genus: Maccaffertium
- Species: M. vicarium

Binomial name
- Maccaffertium vicarium (Walker, 1853)

Synonyms
- Baetis tessellata Walker, 1853; Baetis vicaria Walker, 1853; Ecdyonurus rivulicolus McDunnough, 1933; Heptagenia fusca Clemens, 1913; Stenonema fuscum (Clemens, 1913); Stenonema fuscum fuscum (Clemens, 1913); Stenonema fuscum rivulicolum (McDunnough, 1933); Stenonema rivulicolum (McDunnough, 1933); Stenonema tessellata (Walker, 1853)

= Maccaffertium vicarium =

Species of mayfly

Maccaffertium vicarium is a species of flatheaded mayfly in the family Heptageniidae. It is found in North America.
