= Amerogenia =

Scientific classification
- Domain: Eukaryota
- Kingdom: Animalia
- Phylum: Arthropoda
- Class: Insecta
- Order: Ephemeroptera
- Family: Heptageniidae
- Genus: †Amerogenia; Sinitshenkova, 2000
- Species: †A. macrops

Binomial name
- †Amerogenia macrops Sinitshenkova, 2000

Extinct genus of mayfly

Amerogenia is an extinct genus of mayflies under the family Heptageniidae. It contains the single species Amerogenia macrops.
