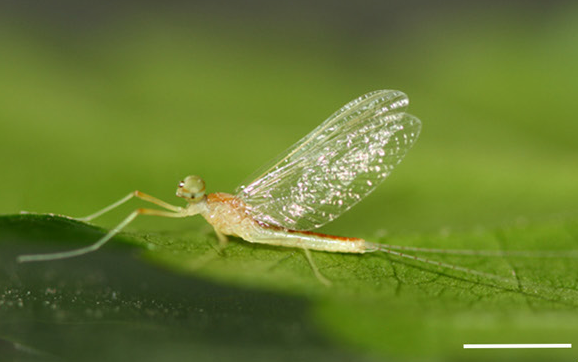
- Afronurus drepanophyllus

Scientific classification
- Domain: Eukaryota
- Kingdom: Animalia
- Phylum: Arthropoda
- Class: Insecta
- Order: Ephemeroptera
- Family: Heptageniidae
- Genus: Afronurus; Lestage, 1924

= Afronurus =

Genus of mayflies

Afronurus is a genus of mayflies in the family Heptageniidae, primarily found in China and Thailand.

== Species ==
There are currently 64 scientifically accepted species under the genus Afronurus:

- Afronurus abracadabrus Kluge, 1983
- Afronurus aethereus Navás, 1936
- Afronurus alces Braasch & Jacobus, 2011
- Afronurus assamensis Kimmins, 1937
- Afronurus barnardi Schoonbee, 1968
- Afronurus bruneiensis Braasch, 2005
- Afronurus cervinus Braasch and Soldán, 1984
- Afronurus chihpenensis Kang & Yang, 1994
- Afronurus collarti Navás, 1930
- Afronurus curtus Dubey, 1971
- Afronurus dama Braasch & Soldán, 1987
- Afronurus elgoensis Puthz, 1971
- Afronurus floreus Kang & Yang, 1994
- Afronurus freitagi Braasch, 2011
- Afronurus furcatus Zhou & Zheng, 2003
- Afronurus gilliesi Corbet, 1962
- Afronurus gilliesianus Braasch, 1990
- Afronurus hainanensis She, Gui, & You, 1995
- Afronurus harrisoni Barnard, 1932
- Afronurus hunanensis Zhang & Cai, 1991
- Afronurus hyalinus Ulmer, 1912
- Afronurus keralensis Braasch & Soldán, 1987
- Afronurus kouandengensis You, 1987
- Afronurus kumbakkaraiensis Venkataraman & Sivaramakrishnan, 1990
- Afronurus landai Braasch & Soldán, 1984
- Afronurus lantuyanensis Braasch, 2011
- Afronurus levis Navás, 1912
- Afronurus leytenensis Braasch, 2011
- Afronurus linzhiensis You, 1987
- Afronurus malaysianus Braasch, 2005
- Afronurus matitensis Sartori & Elouard, 1996
- Afronurus meo Nguyen & Bae, 2003
- Afronurus mindanaoensis Braasch, 2011
- Afronurus mindoroensis Braasch, 2005
- Afronurus mnong Nguyen & Bae, 2003
- Afronurus muehlenbergi Puthz, 1971
- Afronurus namnaoensis Braasch & Boonsoong, 2010
- Afronurus nanhuensis Kang & Yang, 1994
- Afronurus negi Corbet, 1960
- Afronurus obliquistriatus You, Wu, Gui, & Hsu, 1981
- Afronurus oliffi Schoonbee, 1968
- Afronurus otus Braasch & Jacobus, 2011
- Afronurus palawanensis Braasch & Freitag, 2008
- Afronurus panayensis Braasch, 2011
- Afronurus peringueyi Esben-Petersen, 1913
- Afronurus philippinensis Flowers & Pescador, 1984
- Afronurus pulcher Ulmer, 1930
- Afronurus rainulfianus Braasch, 1990
- Afronurus rangifera Braasch & Soldán, 1987
- Afronurus rubromaculatus You, Wu, Gui, & Hsu, 1981
- Afronurus sarawakensis Braasch, 2011
- Afronurus scotti Schoonbee, 1968
- Afronurus separatus Nguyen & Bae, 2004
- Afronurus subflavus Kopelke, 1980
- Afronurus temburongensis Braasch, 2005
- Afronurus ugandanus Kimmins, 1956
- Afronurus viridis Matsumura, 1931
- Afronurus webbi Braasch, 2011
- Afronurus xiasimaensis You, 1987
- Afronurus xizangensis You, 1987
- Afronurus yadongensis You, 1987
- Afronurus yixingensis Wu & You, 1986
- Afronurus yoshidae Takahashi, 1924
- Afronurus zerningi Braasch & Freitag, 2008
