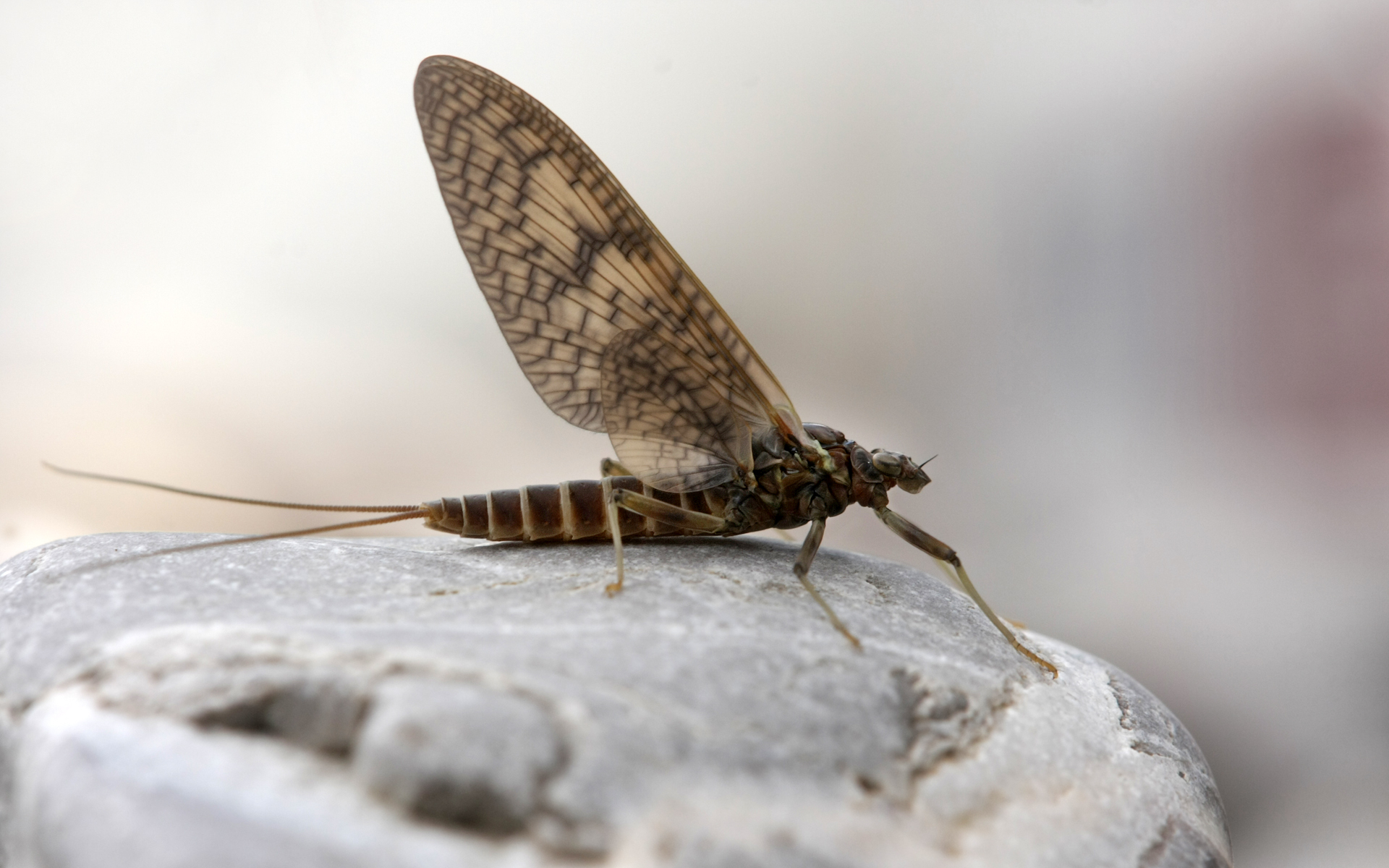
- Rhithrogena germanica

Scientific classification
- Kingdom: Animalia
- Phylum: Arthropoda
- Class: Insecta
- Order: Ephemeroptera
- Suborder: Pisciforma
- Superfamily: Heptagenioidea
- Family: Heptageniidae; Needham, 1901

Synonyms
- Heptaeniidae

= Heptageniidae =

Heptageniidae Temporal range: Turonian–Present

Family of mayflies

The Heptageniidae (synonym: Ecdyonuridae) are a family of mayflies with over 500 described species mainly distributed in the Holarctic, Oriental, and Afrotropical regions, and also present in the Central American Tropics and extreme northern South America.

== Description ==
The group is sometimes referred to as flat-headed mayflies or stream mayflies. These are generally rather small mayflies with three long tails. The wings are usually clear with prominent venation although species with variegated wings are known. As in most mayflies, the males have large compound eyes, but not divided into upper and lower parts.

Heptageniids breed mainly in fast-flowing streams, but some species use still waters. The nymphs have a flattened shape and are usually dark in colour. They use a wide range of food sources with herbivorous, scavenging, and predatory species known.

== Genera ==
The Global Biodiversity Information Facility lists:

1. Acanthomola Whiting & Lehmkuhl, 1987
2. Afghanurus Demoulin, 1961
3. Afronurus Lestage, 1924
4. Amerogenia Sinitshenkova, 2000
5. Anapos Yanai & Sartori, 2017
6. Anepeorus McDunnough, 1925
7. Arthroplea Bengtsson, 1908
8. Asionurus Braasch & Soldán, 1986
9. Atopopus Eaton, 1881
10. Belovius Chernova, 1981
11. Bleptus Eaton, 1885
12. Burshtynogena Godunko & Sontag, 2004
13. Cinygma Eaton, 1885
14. Cinygmula McDunnough, 1933
15. Compsoneuria Eaton, 1881
16. Dacnogenia Kluge, 1988
17. Darthus Webb & McCafferty, 2007
18. Ecdyogymnurus **
19. Ecdyonuroides Dang, 1967
20. Ecdyonurus Eaton, 1868
21. Electrogena Zurwerra & Tomka, 1985
22. Epeorella Ulmer, 1939
23. Epeorus Eaton, 1881
24. Heptagenia Walsh, 1863
25. Ironodes Traver, 1935
26. Kageronia Matsumura, 1931
27. Leucrocuta Flowers, 1980
28. Maccaffertium Bednarik, 1979
29. Macdunnoa Lehmkuhl, 1979
30. Miocoenogenia Tshernova, 1962
31. Nestormeus Godunko, 2004
32. Nixe Flowers, 1980
33. Notacanthurus Chernova, 1974
34. Notacanthurus Tshernova, 1974
35. Paegniodes Eaton, 1881
36. Paracinygmula Bajkova, 1975
37. Parafronurus Zhou & Braasch, 2003
38. Pseudiron McDunnough, 1931
39. Pseudokageronia Masselot & Nel, 1999
40. Raptoheptagenia Whiting & Lehmkuhl, 1987
41. Regulaneuria Zhou, 2021
42. Rhithrogena Eaton, 1881
43. Rhithrogeniella Ulmer, 1939
44. Spinadis Edmunds & Jensen, 1974
45. Stenacron Jensen, 1974
46. Stenonema Traver, 1933
47. Succinogenia Demoulin, 1965
48. Thalerosphyrus Eaton, 1881
49. Thamnodontus Kluge, 2004
50. Trichogenia Braasch & Soldan, 1988

The oldest described member of the family is †Amerogenia from the Late Cretaceous (Turonian) aged New Jersey amber.

== See also ==
- List of mayflies of the British Isles
