= List of Elaphropus species =

These 375 species belong to Elaphropus, a genus of ground beetles in the family Carabidae.

== Elaphropus species ==
Subgenus Ammotachys Boyd & Erwin, 2016

- Elaphropus marchantarius Boyd & Erwin, 2016

Subgenus Barytachys Chaudoir, 1868

- Elaphropus anceps (LeConte, 1848)
- Elaphropus anthrax (LeConte, 1852)
- Elaphropus brevis (Casey, 1918)
- Elaphropus brunnicollis (Motschulsky, 1862)
- Elaphropus capax (LeConte, 1863)
- Elaphropus cockerelli (Fall, 1907)
- Elaphropus congener (Casey, 1918)
- Elaphropus conjugens (Notman, 1919)
- Elaphropus cruciatus (Chaudoir, 1868)
- Elaphropus dolosus (LeConte, 1848)
- Elaphropus fatuus (Casey, 1918)
- Elaphropus ferrugineus (Dejean, 1831)
- Elaphropus fuscicornis (Chaudoir, 1868)
- Elaphropus granarius (Dejean, 1831)
- Elaphropus incurvus (Say, 1830)
- Elaphropus liebecki (Hayward, 1900)
- Elaphropus mellitus (Casey, 1918)
- Elaphropus microspilus (Bates, 1882)
- Elaphropus monticola (Casey, 1918)
- Elaphropus mundulus (Bates, 1882)
- Elaphropus nebulosus (Chaudoir, 1868)
- Elaphropus obesulus (LeConte, 1852)
- Elaphropus obtusellus (Bates, 1882)
- Elaphropus pericallis (Bates, 1882)
- Elaphropus purgatus (Bates, 1882)
- Elaphropus rapax (LeConte, 1852)
- Elaphropus renoicus (Casey, 1918)
- Elaphropus rubricauda (Casey, 1918)
- Elaphropus saturatus (Casey, 1918)
- Elaphropus sectator (Casey, 1918)
- Elaphropus sedulus (Casey, 1918)
- Elaphropus tahoensis (Casey, 1918)
- Elaphropus tripunctatus (Say, 1830)
- Elaphropus tritax (Darlington, 1936)
- Elaphropus unistriatus (Bilimek, 1867)
- Elaphropus vernicatus (Casey, 1918)
- Elaphropus vivax (LeConte, 1848)
- Elaphropus xanthopus (Dejean, 1831)

Subgenus Elaphropus Motschulsky, 1839

- Elaphropus aethiopicus Chaudoir, 1876
- Elaphropus afer (Alluaud, 1933)
- Elaphropus ambiguus (Andrewes, 1925)
- Elaphropus amplians (Bates, 1886)
- Elaphropus asthenes (Andrewes, 1925)
- Elaphropus burgeoni (Alluaud, 1933)
- Elaphropus buxans (Andrewes, 1925)
- Elaphropus caraboides Motschulsky, 1839
- Elaphropus debilis (Péringuey, 1908)
- Elaphropus diversus (Andrewes, 1925)
- Elaphropus ethmoides (Alluaud, 1933)
- Elaphropus eurynotus (Andrewes, 1929)
- Elaphropus fartus (Péringuey, 1896)
- Elaphropus glis (Andrewes, 1925)
- Elaphropus globulus (Dejean, 1831)
- Elaphropus haliploides (Bates, 1892)
- Elaphropus imadatei (Jedlicka, 1966)
- Elaphropus imerinae Basilewsky, 1968
- Elaphropus krueperi (Apfelbeck, 1904)
- Elaphropus latissimus (Motschulsky, 1851)
- Elaphropus madecassus (Alluaud, 1933)
- Elaphropus marggii (Kirschenhofer, 1986)
- Elaphropus meridionalis (Jeannel, 1955)
- Elaphropus nanophyes (Andrewes, 1925)
- Elaphropus natalicus Basilewsky, 1958
- Elaphropus nigritulus (Burgeon, 1935)
- Elaphropus nipponicus (Habu & Baba, 1967)
- Elaphropus numatai (Jedlicka & Chujo, 1966)
- Elaphropus opacus (Andrewes, 1925)
- Elaphropus orphnaeus (Andrewes, 1935)
- Elaphropus ovoideus Jeannel, 1946
- Elaphropus pauliani Bruneau de Miré, 1965
- Elaphropus plumbeus Basilewsky, 1953
- Elaphropus porosus (Andrewes, 1925)
- Elaphropus punctus (Andrewes, 1925)
- Elaphropus saundersi (Andrewes, 1925)
- Elaphropus secutorius (Péringuey, 1908)
- Elaphropus shunichii Saito, 1995
- Elaphropus striatulus (Andrewes, 1925)
- Elaphropus zoster (Andrewes, 1937)
- Elaphropus zouhari (Jedlicka, 1961)

Subgenus Idiotachys Boyd & Erwin, 2016

- Elaphropus acutifrons Boyd & Erwin, 2016

Subgenus Nototachys Alluaud, 1930

- Elaphropus borealis (Andrewes, 1925)
- Elaphropus comptus (Andrewes, 1922)
- Elaphropus occidentalis Boyd & Erwin, 2016
- Elaphropus pluripunctus (Andrewes, 1925)
- Elaphropus pseudocomptus (G.Müller, 1942)
- Elaphropus sebakwensis (Péringuey, 1926)
- Elaphropus senegalensis (Alluaud, 1934)
- Elaphropus sphaeroidalis (Bruneau de Miré, 1952)

Subgenus Physotachys Jeannel, 1946

- Elaphropus pachys (Alluaud, 1936)

Subgenus Sphaerotachys G.Müller, 1926

- Elaphropus burgeoni (Bruneau de Miré, 1963)
- Elaphropus curticollis (Sloane, 1896)
- Elaphropus emellen (Bruneau de Miré, 1990)
- Elaphropus fumicatus (Motschulsky, 1851)
- Elaphropus hoemorroidalis (Ponza, 1805)
- Elaphropus kanalensis (Perroud & Montrouzier, 1864)

Subgenus Tachylopha Motschulsky, 1862

- Elaphropus angolanus (Bruneau de Miré, 1966)
- Elaphropus basilewskyi (Bruneau de Miré, 1966)
- Elaphropus carvalhoi (Bruneau de Miré, 1966)
- Elaphropus chappuisi (Bruneau de Miré, 1963)
- Elaphropus congoanus (Basilewsky, 1948)
- Elaphropus corax (Basilewsky, 1948)
- Elaphropus cordatus (Bruneau de Miré, 1966)
- Elaphropus cordicollis (Bruneau de Miré, 1966)
- Elaphropus denticollis Baehr, 1987
- Elaphropus elegans (Andrewes, 1925)
- Elaphropus eumorphus (Alluaud, 1930)
- Elaphropus expunctus (Bruneau de Miré, 1966)
- Elaphropus feai (Alluaud, 1925)
- Elaphropus formosus (Alluaud, 1939)
- Elaphropus gerardianus (Burgeon, 1935)
- Elaphropus ghesquierei (Burgeon, 1935)
- Elaphropus humeralis (Péringuey, 1896)
- Elaphropus iaspideus (Sloane, 1896)
- Elaphropus jeanneli (Alluaud, 1930)
- Elaphropus laevissimus (Bruneau de Miré, 1963)
- Elaphropus lamottei (Basilewsky, 1954)
- Elaphropus leleupi (Basilewsky in Basilewsky & Straneo, 1950)
- Elaphropus loma (Basilewsky, 1971)
- Elaphropus massarti (Bruneau de Miré, 1966)
- Elaphropus maximus (Bruneau de Miré, 1966)
- Elaphropus mediopunctatus (Bruneau de Miré, 1966)
- Elaphropus monticola (Bruneau de Miré, 1966)
- Elaphropus morphnus (Alluaud, 1930)
- Elaphropus obliteratus (Andrewes, 1925)
- Elaphropus optimus (Péringuey, 1898)
- Elaphropus ovatus (Motschulsky, 1851)
- Elaphropus pauliani (Basilewsky, 1968)
- Elaphropus pseudofeai (Bruneau de Miré, 1966)
- Elaphropus pwetoensis (Burgeon, 1935)
- Elaphropus queinneci (Echaroux, 2014)
- Elaphropus reebi (Echaroux, 2014)
- Elaphropus rubronitens (Bruneau de Miré, 1966)
- Elaphropus seydeli (Bruneau de Miré, 1966)
- Elaphropus spenceri (Sloane, 1896)
- Elaphropus strongylus (Alluaud, 1930)
- Elaphropus tecospilus (Basilewsky, 1948)
- Elaphropus tshuapanus (Bruneau de Miré, 1966)

Subgenus Tachyura Motschulsky, 1862

- Elaphropus abimva (Burgeon, 1935)
- Elaphropus aeneus (Putzeys, 1875)
- Elaphropus aequistriatus Baehr, 2014
- Elaphropus akkadi (Abdel-Dayem, 2009)
- Elaphropus amabilis (Dejean, 1831)
- Elaphropus amplipennis (W.J.MacLeay, 1871)
- Elaphropus andrewesi (Jedlicka, 1932)
- Elaphropus angusticollis (Reitter in F.Hauser, 1894)
- Elaphropus annae (Burgeon, 1935)
- Elaphropus anomalus (Kolenati, 1845)
- Elaphropus apicalis (Boheman, 1848)
- Elaphropus arcuatus (Putzeys, 1875)
- Elaphropus ascendens (Alluaud, 1917)
- Elaphropus auberti (Bruneau de Miré, 1964)
- Elaphropus axillaris (Bruneau de Miré, 1952)
- Elaphropus babaulti (Andrewes, 1924)
- Elaphropus badius (Minowa, 1932)
- Elaphropus banksi (Sloane, 1921)
- Elaphropus barringtoni (Andrewes, 1925)
- Elaphropus bechynei (Basilewsky, 1956)
- Elaphropus belli (Andrewes, 1925)
- Elaphropus bembidiiformis (Jordan, 1894)
- Elaphropus biblis (Britton, 1948)
- Elaphropus bibulus (Coquerel, 1866)
- Elaphropus biby (Alluaud, 1918)
- Elaphropus biplagiatus (Dejean, 1831)
- Elaphropus bipustulatus (W.J.MacLeay, 1871)
- Elaphropus bisbimaculatus (Chevrolat, 1860)
- Elaphropus bisignatus (Boheman, 1848)
- Elaphropus blandus (Andrewes, 1924)
- Elaphropus boninensis (Nakane, 1979)
- Elaphropus borneensis (Andrewes, 1925)
- Elaphropus brittoni Baehr, 1987
- Elaphropus buprestioides (Sloane, 1896)
- Elaphropus capicola (Péringuey, 1896)
- Elaphropus cautus (Péringuey, 1898)
- Elaphropus ceylanicus (Nietner, 1858)
- Elaphropus chalceus (Andrewes, 1925)
- Elaphropus championi (Andrewes, 1925)
- Elaphropus charactus (Andrewes, 1925)
- Elaphropus charis (Andrewes, 1925)
- Elaphropus chimbu (Darlington, 1962)
- Elaphropus chujoi (Jedlicka, 1965)
- Elaphropus collarti (Burgeon, 1935)
- Elaphropus compactus (Andrewes, 1925)
- Elaphropus confusus (Coulon & Felix, 2011)
- Elaphropus conspicuus (Schaum, 1863)
- Elaphropus constrictus (Andrewes, 1925)
- Elaphropus convexicollis (Jeannel, 1946)
- Elaphropus conveximargo (Baehr, 2016)
- Elaphropus convexulus (Darlington, 1963)
- Elaphropus convexus (W.J.MacLeay, 1871)
- Elaphropus crassus (Darlington, 1962)
- Elaphropus curvimanus (Wollaston, 1854)
- Elaphropus decoratus (Andrewes, 1925)
- Elaphropus diabrachys (Kolenati, 1845)
- Elaphropus didymus Baehr, 1987
- Elaphropus divisus (Darlington, 1962)
- Elaphropus donaldi (Alluaud, 1916)
- Elaphropus drimostomoides (Fairmaire, 1869)
- Elaphropus dubius (Minowa, 1932)
- Elaphropus duplicatus Baehr, 2014
- Elaphropus elutus (Andrewes, 1935)
- Elaphropus emeritus (Péringuey, 1898)
- Elaphropus erotyloides (Andrewes, 1925)
- Elaphropus eueides (Bates, 1886)
- Elaphropus euphraticus (Reitter, 1885)
- Elaphropus expansicollis (Bates, 1892)
- Elaphropus fadli (Abdel-Dayem, 2009)
- Elaphropus faustus (Péringuey, 1896)
- Elaphropus ferroa (Kopecky in Löbl & Smetana, 2003)
- Elaphropus ferrugatus (Reitter, 1895)
- Elaphropus finitimus (Walker, 1858)
- Elaphropus flavicornis (Sloane, 1921)
- Elaphropus florus (Andrewes, 1925)
- Elaphropus fluviatilis (Bruneau de Miré, 1964)
- Elaphropus fordi (Darlington, 1962)
- Elaphropus frischi (Coulon & Felix, 2009)
- Elaphropus fukiensis (Jedlicka, 1965)
- Elaphropus fumatus (Darlington, 1962)
- Elaphropus fur (Basilewsky, 1954)
- Elaphropus fuscicauda (Bates, 1873)
- Elaphropus fusculus (Schaum, 1860)
- Elaphropus fusiformis (Andrewes, 1925)
- Elaphropus gerardi (Burgeon, 1935)
- Elaphropus germanus (Chaudoir, 1876)
- Elaphropus gestroi (Andrewes, 1925)
- Elaphropus gongylus (Andrewes, 1925)
- Elaphropus gradatus (Bates, 1873)
- Elaphropus grandicollis (Chaudoir, 1846)
- Elaphropus granum (Alluaud, 1936)
- Elaphropus grimmi Baehr, 2016
- Elaphropus hamoni (Jeannel, 1953)
- Elaphropus helmsi (Sloane, 1898)
- Elaphropus hiermeieri Baehr, 2014
- Elaphropus hirsutus Baehr, 2014
- Elaphropus holomelas Baehr, 2014
- Elaphropus horni (Andrewes, 1935)
- Elaphropus hydraenoides (Alluaud, 1936)
- Elaphropus imitans (Péringuey, 1896)
- Elaphropus imperfectus (Andrewes, 1925)
- Elaphropus inaequalis (Kolenati, 1845)
- Elaphropus incilis (Andrewes, 1929)
- Elaphropus interpunctatus (Putzeys, 1875)
- Elaphropus iranicus (Jedlicka, 1963)
- Elaphropus jakli Baehr, 2014
- Elaphropus javanicus (Andrewes, 1925)
- Elaphropus klapperichi (Jedlicka, 1953)
- Elaphropus klugii (Nietner, 1858)
- Elaphropus kuriharai (Morita, 2008)
- Elaphropus laetificus (Bates, 1873)
- Elaphropus laotinus (Andrewes, 1925)
- Elaphropus latus (Peyron, 1858)
- Elaphropus lembodes (Andrewes, 1936)
- Elaphropus leptothorax Baehr, 1987
- Elaphropus lindemannae (Jedlicka, 1963)
- Elaphropus longior (Burgeon, 1935)
- Elaphropus loriae (Andrewes, 1925)
- Elaphropus lucasii (Jacquelin du Val, 1852)
- Elaphropus lusindoi (Burgeon, 1935)
- Elaphropus luteus (Andrewes, 1925)
- Elaphropus madagascariensis (Fairmaire, 1869)
- Elaphropus majusculus (Chaudoir, 1876)
- Elaphropus malabaricus (Andrewes, 1925)
- Elaphropus marani (Jedlicka, 1932)
- Elaphropus martensi Baehr, 2016
- Elaphropus milneanus (Darlington, 1962)
- Elaphropus moestus (Péringuey, 1926)
- Elaphropus momvu (Burgeon, 1935)
- Elaphropus mutatus (Darlington, 1962)
- Elaphropus nadzab (Darlington, 1962)
- Elaphropus nalandae (Andrewes, 1925)
- Elaphropus nanlingensis (Sun & Tian, 2013)
- Elaphropus nannodes (Andrewes, 1925)
- Elaphropus nepos (Darlington, 1962)
- Elaphropus nervosus (Sloane, 1903)
- Elaphropus nigellus (Andrewes, 1935)
- Elaphropus nigrolimbatus (Péringuey, 1908)
- Elaphropus nilgiricus (Andrewes, 1925)
- Elaphropus nitens (Andrewes, 1925)
- Elaphropus notaphoides (Bates, 1886)
- Elaphropus ocellatus (Bates, 1892)
- Elaphropus ordensis Baehr, 1987
- Elaphropus ovensensis (Blackburn, 1891)
- Elaphropus pakistanus (Jedlicka, 1963)
- Elaphropus pallidicauda (Burgeon, 1935)
- Elaphropus pallidicornis (Andrewes, 1925)
- Elaphropus papuae (Andrewes, 1925)
- Elaphropus par (Darlington, 1962)
- Elaphropus parapictus (Darlington, 1962)
- Elaphropus parasenarius (Darlington, 1971)
- Elaphropus parvulus (Dejean, 1831)
- Elaphropus patruelis (Baehr, 2016)
- Elaphropus peryphinus (Bates, 1886)
- Elaphropus pictus (Andrewes, 1925)
- Elaphropus poecilopterus (Bates, 1873)
- Elaphropus politus (Motschulsky, 1851)
- Elaphropus polyporus (Andrewes, 1925)
- Elaphropus pseudoconvexulus Baehr, 1987
- Elaphropus pseudoornatus Baehr, 2014
- Elaphropus psiloides (Darlington, 1962)
- Elaphropus psilus (Andrewes, 1925)
- Elaphropus pulcher (Andrewes, 1925)
- Elaphropus quadrisignatus (Duftschmid, 1812)
- Elaphropus radjabii (Morvan, 1973)
- Elaphropus ravouxi (Jeannel, 1941)
- Elaphropus reticulatus (Andrewes, 1925)
- Elaphropus reticuloides (Darlington, 1962)
- Elaphropus rubescens (Andrewes, 1925)
- Elaphropus rufinus Baehr, 2016
- Elaphropus rufoniger Baehr, 2014
- Elaphropus sabulosus (Bruneau de Miré, 1990)
- Elaphropus salemus (Andrewes, 1933)
- Elaphropus schawalleri Baehr, 2016
- Elaphropus schuelei Baehr, 2014
- Elaphropus senarius (Darlington, 1962)
- Elaphropus septemstriatus Baehr, 2014
- Elaphropus serrulatus (Jeannel, 1946)
- Elaphropus serrulipennis Baehr, 2016
- Elaphropus sexstriatus (Duftschmid, 1812)
- Elaphropus shahinei (Schatzmayr & Koch, 1934)
- Elaphropus shirazi (Jedlicka, 1968)
- Elaphropus sinaiticus (Schatzmayr, 1936)
- Elaphropus singularis (Andrewes, 1925)
- Elaphropus skalei Baehr, 2014
- Elaphropus solidus (Sloane, 1921)
- Elaphropus spurcus (Andrewes, 1925)
- Elaphropus spurius (Péringuey, 1896)
- Elaphropus stenoderus (Andrewes, 1935)
- Elaphropus stevensi (Andrewes, 1925)
- Elaphropus straneoi (Basilewsky, 1962)
- Elaphropus striatifrons (Andrewes, 1925)
- Elaphropus striolatus (W.J.MacLeay, 1871)
- Elaphropus subfumatus (Darlington, 1962)
- Elaphropus submutatus (Darlington, 1962)
- Elaphropus subopacus Baehr, 1987
- Elaphropus surdus (Basilewsky, 1953)
- Elaphropus suturalis (Motschulsky, 1851)
- Elaphropus tagax (Andrewes, 1925)
- Elaphropus tatei (Darlington, 1971)
- Elaphropus tetradymus (Fairmaire, 1893)
- Elaphropus tetraspilus (Solsky, 1874)
- Elaphropus thlibodes (Andrewes, 1935)
- Elaphropus thoracicus (Kolenati, 1845)
- Elaphropus tor (Darlington, 1971)
- Elaphropus tostus (Andrewes, 1925)
- Elaphropus transversalis (Bruneau de Miré, 1952)
- Elaphropus triloris (Andrewes, 1925)
- Elaphropus trinervis (Darlington, 1962)
- Elaphropus trisulcatus (Emden, 1937)
- Elaphropus tshibindensis (Burgeon, 1935)
- Elaphropus ubangiensis (Basilewsky, 1952)
- Elaphropus unitarius (Bates, 1892)
- Elaphropus vadoni (Jeannel, 1946)
- Elaphropus vafer (Andrewes, 1935)
- Elaphropus vagabundus (Andrewes, 1935)
- Elaphropus vagans (Péringuey, 1896)
- Elaphropus vandenberghei (Basilewsky in Basilewsky & Straneo, 1950)
- Elaphropus vangelei (Basilewsky, 1952)
- Elaphropus variabilis (Chaudoir, 1876)
- Elaphropus victoriensis (Blackburn, 1891)
- Elaphropus vigens (Andrewes, 1925)
- Elaphropus virgatus (Andrewes, 1925)
- Elaphropus vixmaculatus (Andrewes, 1925)
- Elaphropus walkerianus (Sharp, 1913)
- Elaphropus weigeli Baehr, 2014
- Elaphropus yunax (Darlington, 1939)
- Elaphropus zulficari (Schatzmayr & Koch, 1934)

Subgenus Tachyuropsis Shilenkov, 2002

- Elaphropus bodemeyeri (A.Fleischer, 1915)
- Elaphropus bombycinus (Andrewes, 1925)
- Elaphropus castaneus (Andrewes, 1925)
- Elaphropus dulcis (Andrewes, 1925)
- Elaphropus exaratus (Bates, 1873)
- Elaphropus holzschuhi (Baehr, 2015)
- Elaphropus micraulax (Andrewes, 1924)
- Elaphropus rhombophorus (Andrewes, 1925)

Subgenus †Tarsitachys Erwin, 1971

- †Elaphropus bilobus (Erwin, 1971)
