= Congener =

Congener may refer to:

- Congener (biology), organisms within the same genus
- Congener (chemistry), related chemicals, e.g., elements in the same group of the periodic table
- Congener (beverages), a substance other than ethanol produced during the fermentation of alcoholic beverages

== Species ==
- Agabus congener, a beetle in the family Dytiscidae
- Amata congener, a moth in the family Erebidae
- Amyema congener, a flowering plant in the family Loranthaceae
- Arthroplea congener, a mayfly in the family Arthropleidae
- Elaphropus congener, a ground beetle in the family Carabidae
- Gemmula congener, a sea snail in the family Turridae
- Heterachthes congener, a beetle in the family Cerambycidae
- Lestes congener, a damselfly in the family Lestidae
- Megacyllene congener, a beetle in the family Cerambycidae
- Potamarcha congener, a dragonfly in the family Libellulidae

== See also ==
- Congenic, in genetics
- PCB congener list
