= Acanthametropus pecatonica =

Conservation status
- Extinct (IUCN 3.1)

Scientific classification
- Kingdom: Animalia
- Phylum: Arthropoda
- Clade: Pancrustacea
- Class: Insecta
- Order: Ephemeroptera
- Family: Acanthametropodidae
- Genus: Acanthametropus
- Species: †A. pecatonica

Binomial name
- †Acanthametropus pecatonica Burks, 1953

Species of mayfly

Acanthametropus pecatonica, the Pecatonica River mayfly, is a species of mayfly in the family Acanthametropodidae. It is endemic to the Pecatonica River of Wisconsin and Illinois, with populations observed in South Carolina and Georgia.

Acanthametropus pecatonica has been considered extinct by the IUCN with 1927 given as the year it was last seen. The IUCN has last assessed it as extinct in 1994, even though it was rediscovered in 1987. It has been found in at least five counties of Wisconsin, and historically at locations in Illinois, South Carolina, and Georgia.
