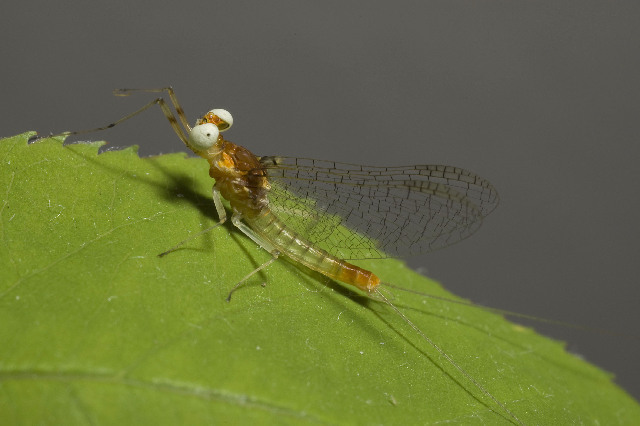
- Maccaffertium terminatum

Scientific classification
- Domain: Eukaryota
- Kingdom: Animalia
- Phylum: Arthropoda
- Class: Insecta
- Order: Ephemeroptera
- Suborder: Pisciforma
- Superfamily: Heptagenioidea

Families
- Arthropleidae; Heptageniidae; Isonychiidae; Oligoneuriidae; Pseudironidae

= Heptagenioidea =

Superfamily of mayflies

Heptagenioidea is a superfamily of mayflies. Members of this superfamily are found in most parts of the world apart from the Arctic and Antarctic, with Heptageniidae being the most widely distributed family.

Heptagenioidea probably originated in the Jurassic period when mayflies started breeding in flowing water, the mouthparts and forelegs becoming adapted to passive feeding. The ancestors of the new group had bred in still water, and the opportunities provided by the change in environment encouraged rapid radiation.
