= Homoeoneuria ammophila =

Scientific classification
- Domain: Eukaryota
- Kingdom: Animalia
- Phylum: Arthropoda
- Class: Insecta
- Order: Ephemeroptera
- Family: Oligoneuriidae
- Genus: Homoeoneuria
- Species: H. ammophila

Binomial name
- Homoeoneuria ammophila (Spieth, 1938)

Synonyms
- Oligoneuria ammophila Spieth, 1938

Species of mayfly

Homoeoneuria ammophila is a species of brushleg mayfly in the family Oligoneuriidae. It is found in North America.
