= Arthroplea bipunctata =

Scientific classification
- Domain: Eukaryota
- Kingdom: Animalia
- Phylum: Arthropoda
- Class: Insecta
- Order: Ephemeroptera
- Family: Arthropleidae
- Genus: Arthroplea
- Species: A. bipunctata

Binomial name
- Arthroplea bipunctata (McDunnough, 1924)

Synonyms
- Cinygma bipunctata McDunnough, 1924

Species of mayfly

Arthroplea bipunctata is a species of flatheaded mayfly in the family Arthropleidae. It is found in North America.
