= Isonychia georgiae =

Scientific classification
- Domain: Eukaryota
- Kingdom: Animalia
- Phylum: Arthropoda
- Class: Insecta
- Order: Ephemeroptera
- Family: Isonychiidae
- Genus: Isonychia
- Species: I. georgiae

Binomial name
- Isonychia georgiae McDunnough, 1931

Synonyms
- Isonychia annulata Traver, 1932; Isonychia notata Traver, 1932; Isonychia thalia Traver, 1934

Species of mayfly

Isonychia georgiae is a species of brushlegged mayfly in the family Isonychiidae. It is found in North America.
