= Arthroplea =

Scientific classification
- Domain: Eukaryota
- Kingdom: Animalia
- Phylum: Arthropoda
- Class: Insecta
- Order: Ephemeroptera
- Family: Arthropleidae
- Genus: Arthroplea; Bengtsson, 1908

Genus of mayflies

Arthroplea is a genus of flatheaded mayflies in the family Arthropleidae. There are at least two described species in Arthroplea.

== Species ==
These two species belong to the genus Arthroplea:

- Arthroplea bipunctata (McDunnough, 1924)
- Arthroplea congener Bengtsson, 1908
