= Elaphropus papuae =

Scientific classification
- Domain: Eukaryota
- Kingdom: Animalia
- Phylum: Arthropoda
- Class: Insecta
- Order: Coleoptera
- Suborder: Adephaga
- Family: Carabidae
- Genus: Elaphropus
- Species: E. papuae

Binomial name
- Elaphropus papuae (Andrewes, 1925)

Synonyms
- Tachys papuae Andrewes, 1925

Species of beetle

Elaphropus papuae is a species of ground beetle in the subfamily Trechinae. It was described by Herbert Andrewes in 1925.
