= Lachlania =

Scientific classification
- Domain: Eukaryota
- Kingdom: Animalia
- Phylum: Arthropoda
- Class: Insecta
- Order: Ephemeroptera
- Family: Oligoneuriidae
- Genus: Lachlania; Hagen, 1868

Synonyms
- Alloydia Needham, 1932; Neophlebia Navás, 1912; Noya Navás, 1912; Noyopsis Navás, 1924

Genus of mayflies

Lachlania is a genus of mayflies in the family Oligoneuriidae.

== Species ==
This genus contains 14 accepted species:

- Lachlania abnormis Hagen, 1868
- Lachlania boanovae Da-Silva & Pereira, 1993
- Lachlania cacautana Needham, 1932
- Lachlania dencyanna Koss, 1970
- Lachlania dominguezi Pereira, 1989
- Lachlania fusca Navás, 1924
- Lachlania garciai Navás, 1912
- Lachlania iops Allen & Cohen, 1977
- Lachlania lucida Eaton, 1885
- Lachlania pallipes Eaton, 1883
- Lachlania radai Navás, 1926
- Lachlania santosi Pereira, 1987
- Lachlania saskatchewanensis Ide, 1941
- Lachlania talea Allen & Cohen, 1977
