= Homoeoneuria =

Scientific classification
- Domain: Eukaryota
- Kingdom: Animalia
- Phylum: Arthropoda
- Class: Insecta
- Order: Ephemeroptera
- Family: Oligoneuriidae
- Subfamily: Oligoneuriinae
- Genus: Homoeoneuria; Eaton, 1881

Genus of mayflies

Homoeoneuria is a genus of brushleg mayflies in the family Oligoneuriidae. There are at least 5 described species in Homoeoneuria.

== Species ==
- Homoeoneuria alleni Pescador and Peters, 1980
- Homoeoneuria ammophila (Spieth, 1938)
- Homoeoneuria cahabensis Pescador and Peters, 1980
- Homoeoneuria dolani Edmunds, Berner and Traver, 1958
- Homoeoneuria salviniae Eaton, 1881
