= Elaphropus fumatus =

Scientific classification
- Kingdom: Animalia
- Phylum: Arthropoda
- Class: Insecta
- Order: Coleoptera
- Suborder: Adephaga
- Family: Carabidae
- Genus: Elaphropus
- Species: E. fumatus

Binomial name
- Elaphropus fumatus (Darlington, 1962)

Species of beetle

Elaphropus fumatus is a species of ground beetle in the subfamily Trechinae. It was described by Darlington in 1962.
