= Analetris =

Scientific classification
- Domain: Eukaryota
- Kingdom: Animalia
- Phylum: Arthropoda
- Class: Insecta
- Order: Ephemeroptera
- Family: Acanthametropodidae
- Genus: Analetris; Edmunds, 1972

Genus of mayflies

Analetris is a genus of sand-dwelling mayflies in the family Acanthametropodidae. There are at least two described species in Analetris.

== Species ==
These two species belong to the genus Analetris:

- Analetris eximia Edmunds, 1972
- † Analetris secundus Godunko & Klonowska-Olejnik, 2006
