= Elaphropus gerardi =

Scientific classification
- Kingdom: Animalia
- Phylum: Arthropoda
- Class: Insecta
- Order: Coleoptera
- Suborder: Adephaga
- Family: Carabidae
- Genus: Elaphropus
- Species: E. gerardi

Binomial name
- Elaphropus gerardi (Burgeon, 1935)

Species of beetle

Elaphropus gerardi is a species of ground beetle in the subfamily Trechinae. It was described by Burgeon in 1935.
