= Elaphropus ambiguus =

Scientific classification
- Domain: Eukaryota
- Kingdom: Animalia
- Phylum: Arthropoda
- Class: Insecta
- Order: Coleoptera
- Suborder: Adephaga
- Family: Carabidae
- Genus: Elaphropus
- Species: E. ambiguus

Binomial name
- Elaphropus ambiguus (Andrewes, 1925)

Synonyms
- Tachys ambiguus Andrewes, 1925

Species of beetle

Elaphropus ambiguus is a species of ground beetle in the subfamily Trechinae. It was described by Herbert Edward Andrewes in 1925.
