= Oligoneuria =

Scientific classification
- Kingdom: Animalia
- Phylum: Arthropoda
- Clade: Pancrustacea
- Class: Insecta
- Order: Ephemeroptera
- Family: Oligoneuriidae
- Genus: Oligoneuria; Pictet, 1843

Synonyms
- Yawari Salles, Soares, Massariol & Faria, 2014; Oligoneurioides Demoulin, 1955

Genus of mayflies

Oligoneuria is a genus of mayflies in the family Oligoneuriidae. The genus was erected for Oligoneuria anomala, originally described on the basis of two female subimagos from Brazil. It was given the name for its characteristic and unusual reduction in longitudinal and cross veins. It remained a monotypic species until 2007, and since then several new species were described from Brazil. Additionally the genus Oligoneurioides erected in 1955 was considered a synonym.

== Species ==
Species accepted as of May 2025:

- Oligoneuria amandae Salles, Soares, Massariol & Faria, 2014
- Oligoneuria amazonicus (Demoulin, 1955)
- Oligoneuria anomala Pictet, 1843
- Oligoneuria itayana Kluge, 2007
- Oligoneuria macabaica Gonçalves, Da-Silva & Nessimian, 2011
- Oligoneuria mitra Salles, Soares, Massariol & Faria, 2014
- Oligoneuria truncata Salles, Soares, Massariol & Faria, 2014
