= Elaphropus granarius =

Scientific classification
- Kingdom: Animalia
- Phylum: Arthropoda
- Class: Insecta
- Order: Coleoptera
- Suborder: Adephaga
- Family: Carabidae
- Genus: Elaphropus
- Species: E. granarius

Binomial name
- Elaphropus granarius (Dejean, 1831)

Synonyms
- Barytachys glossema Casey, 1884; Bembidium granarium Dejean, 1831; Elaphropus occultus (LeConte, 1848); Tachys occultus LeConte, 1848

Species of beetle

Elaphropus granarius is a species of ground beetle in the family Carabidae. It is found in North America.
