= Elaphropus submutatus =

Scientific classification
- Kingdom: Animalia
- Phylum: Arthropoda
- Class: Insecta
- Order: Coleoptera
- Suborder: Adephaga
- Family: Carabidae
- Genus: Elaphropus
- Species: E. submutatus

Binomial name
- Elaphropus submutatus (Darlington, 1962)

Species of beetle

Elaphropus submutatus is a species of ground beetle in the subfamily Trechinae, which was described by Darlington in 1962.
