= Elaphropus pallidicornis =

Scientific classification
- Domain: Eukaryota
- Kingdom: Animalia
- Phylum: Arthropoda
- Class: Insecta
- Order: Coleoptera
- Suborder: Adephaga
- Family: Carabidae
- Genus: Elaphropus
- Species: E. pallidicornis

Binomial name
- Elaphropus pallidicornis (Andrewes, 1925)

Synonyms
- Tachys pallidicornis Andrewes, 1925

Species of beetle

Elaphropus pallidicornis is a species of ground beetle in the subfamily Trechinae. It was described by Herbert Edward Andrewes in 1925.
