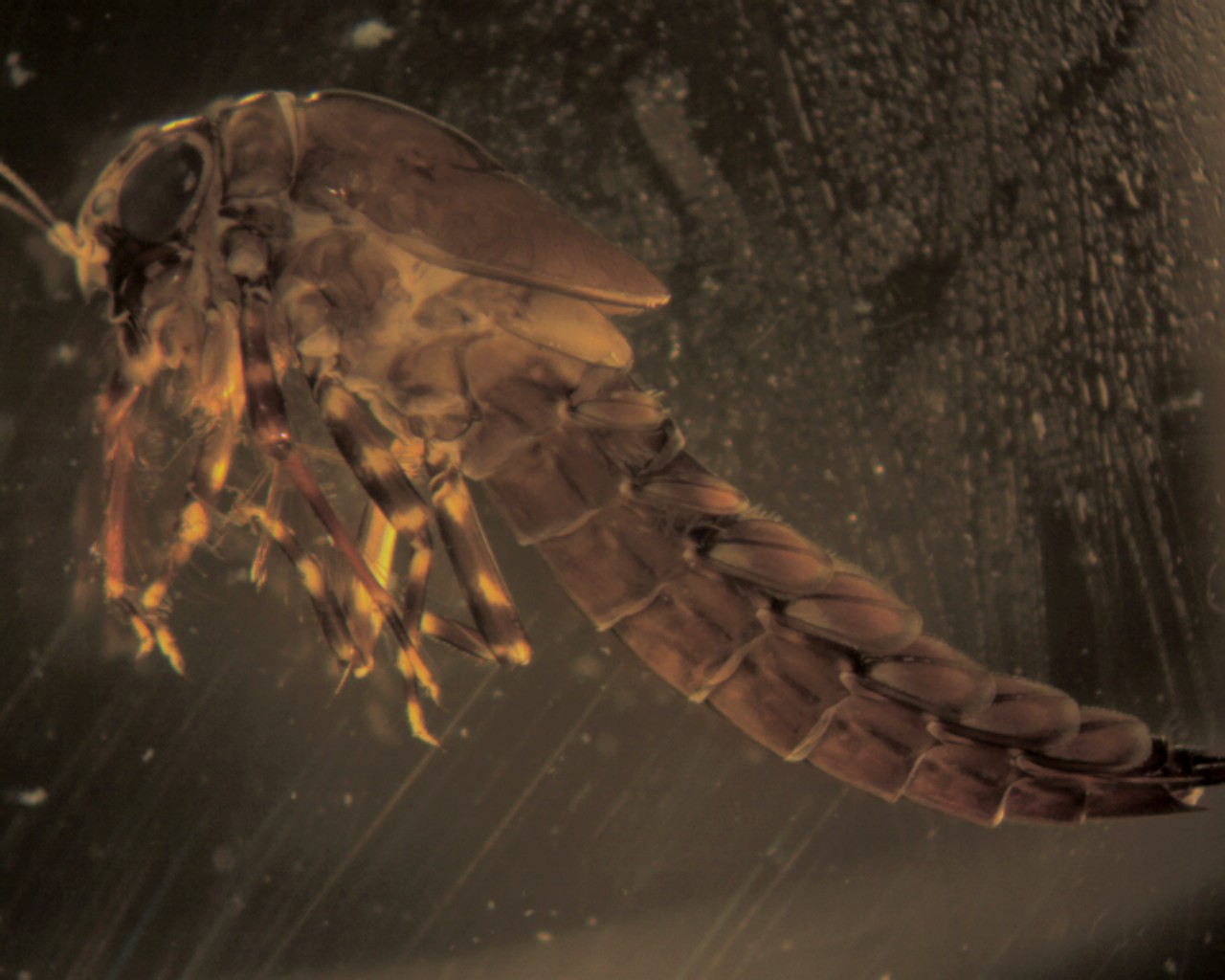

Scientific classification
- Domain: Eukaryota
- Kingdom: Animalia
- Phylum: Arthropoda
- Class: Insecta
- Order: Ephemeroptera
- Suborder: Pisciforma
- Superfamily: Heptagenioidea
- Family: Isonychiidae
- Genus: Isonychia; Eaton, 1871

= Isonychia =

Genus of mayflies

Isonychia is a genus of brushlegged mayflies in the family Isonychiidae, the sole genus of the family. There are more than 30 described species in Isonychia.

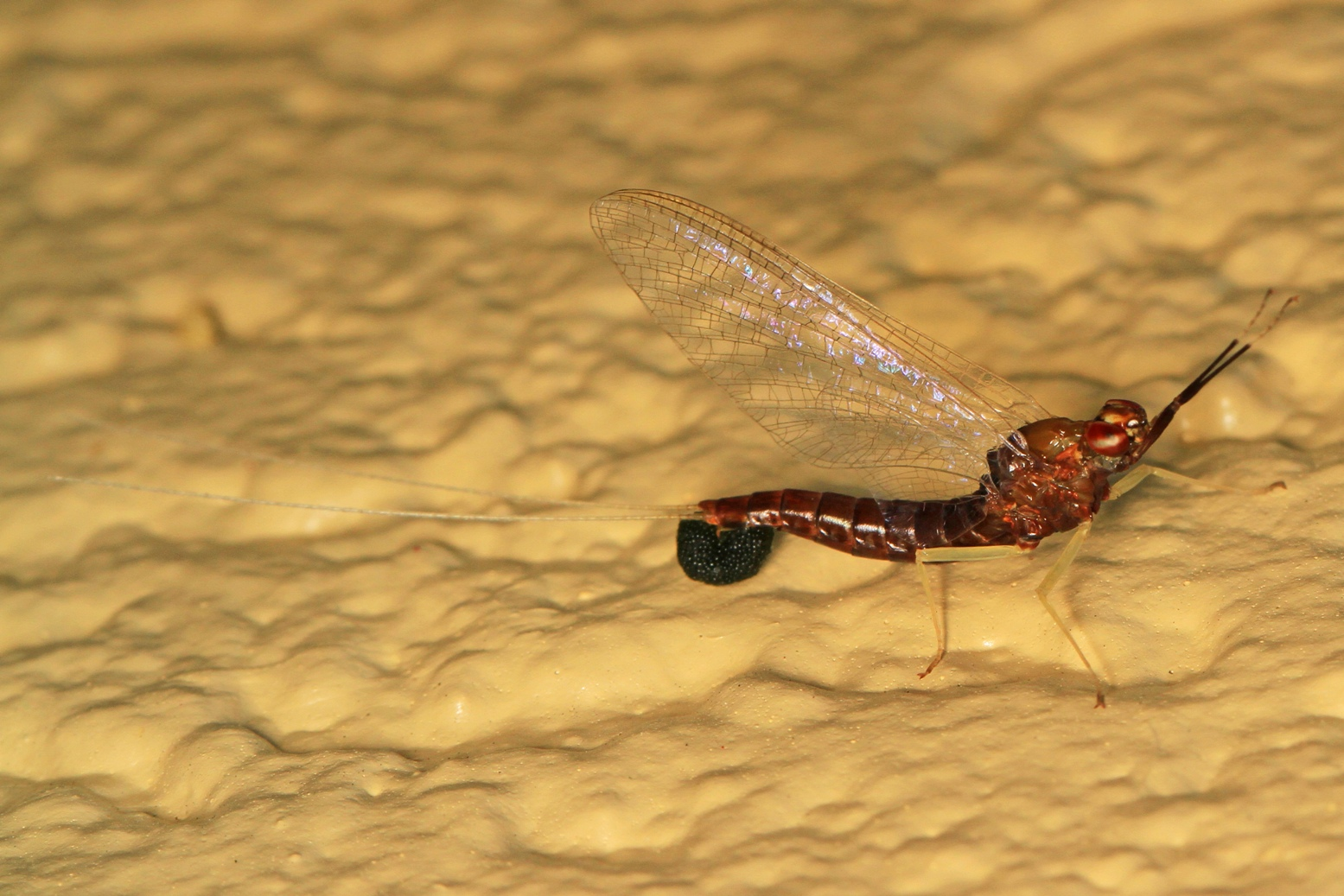

== Species ==
These 36 species belong to the genus Isonychia:

- Isonychia arabica Al-Zubaidi, Braasch & Al-Kayatt, 1987
- Isonychia arida (Say, 1839)
- Isonychia berneri Kondratieff & Voshell, 1984
- Isonychia bicolor (Walker, 1853) (mahogany dun)
- Isonychia campestris McDunnough, 1931
- Isonychia crassiuscula Tiunova, Kluge & Ishiwata, 2004
- Isonychia diversa Traver, 1934
- Isonychia formosana (Ulmer, 1912)
- Isonychia formosus Ulmer, 1912
- Isonychia georgiae McDunnough, 1931
- Isonychia grandis (Ulmer, 1913)
- Isonychia guixiensis Wu & Gui, 1992
- Isonychia hoffmani Kondratieff & Voshell, 1984
- Isonychia ignota (Walker, 1853)
- Isonychia intermedia (Eaton, 1885)
- Isonychia japonica (Ulmer, 1920)
- Isonychia khyberensis (Ali, 1970)
- Isonychia kiangsinensis Hsu, 1936
- Isonychia obscura Traver, 1932
- Isonychia rufa McDunnough, 1931
- Isonychia sayi Burks, 1953
- Isonychia serrata Traver, 1932
- Isonychia sexpetala Tiunova, Kluge & Ishiwata, 2004
- Isonychia shima (Matsumura, 1931)
- Isonychia sibirica Tiunova, Kluge & Ishiwata, 2004
- Isonychia sicca (Walsh, 1862)
- Isonychia similis Traver, 1932
- Isonychia sinensis Wu & Gui, 1992
- Isonychia sumatranus (Navás, 1933)
- Isonychia tusculanensis Berner, 1948
- Isonychia unicolorata Tiunova, Kluge & Ishiwata, 2004
- Isonychia ussurica Bajkova, 1970
- Isonychia velma Needham, 1932
- Isonychia vshivkovae Tiunova, Kluge & Ishiwata, 2004
- Isonychia winkleri Ulmer, 1939
- † Isonychia alderensis Lewis, 1977
