= Elaphropus rubronitens =

Scientific classification
- Kingdom: Animalia
- Phylum: Arthropoda
- Class: Insecta
- Order: Coleoptera
- Suborder: Adephaga
- Family: Carabidae
- Genus: Elaphropus
- Species: E. rubronitens

Binomial name
- Elaphropus rubronitens (Bruneau De Mire, 1966)

Species of beetle

Elaphropus rubronitens is a species of ground beetle in the subfamily Trechinae. It was described by Bruneau De Mire in 1966.
