= Elaphropus conjugens =

Scientific classification
- Domain: Eukaryota
- Kingdom: Animalia
- Phylum: Arthropoda
- Class: Insecta
- Order: Coleoptera
- Suborder: Adephaga
- Family: Carabidae
- Genus: Elaphropus
- Species: E. conjugens

Binomial name
- Elaphropus conjugens (Notman, 1919)

Species of beetle

Elaphropus conjugens is a species of ground beetle in the family Carabidae. It is found in North America.
