= Pseudiron =

Scientific classification
- Domain: Eukaryota
- Kingdom: Animalia
- Phylum: Arthropoda
- Class: Insecta
- Order: Ephemeroptera
- Suborder: Pisciforma
- Superfamily: Heptagenioidea
- Family: Pseudironidae
- Genus: Pseudiron; McDunnough, 1931
- Species: P. centralis

Binomial name
- Pseudiron centralis McDunnough, 1931

Genus of mayflies

Pseudiron is a genus of crabwalker mayflies in the family Pseudironidae. There is one described species in Pseudiron, Pseudiron centralis.
