= Isonychia arida =

Scientific classification
- Domain: Eukaryota
- Kingdom: Animalia
- Phylum: Arthropoda
- Class: Insecta
- Order: Ephemeroptera
- Family: Isonychiidae
- Genus: Isonychia
- Species: I. arida

Binomial name
- Isonychia arida (Say, 1839)

Synonyms
- Baetis arida Say, 1839; Isonychia pictipes Traver, 1934

Species of mayfly

Isonychia arida is a species of brushlegged mayfly in the family Isonychiidae. It is found in North America.
