= Isonychia obscura =

Scientific classification
- Domain: Eukaryota
- Kingdom: Animalia
- Phylum: Arthropoda
- Class: Insecta
- Order: Ephemeroptera
- Family: Isonychiidae
- Genus: Isonychia
- Species: I. obscura

Binomial name
- Isonychia obscura Traver, 1932

Species of mayfly

Isonychia obscura is a species of brushlegged mayfly in the family Isonychiidae. It is found in North America.
