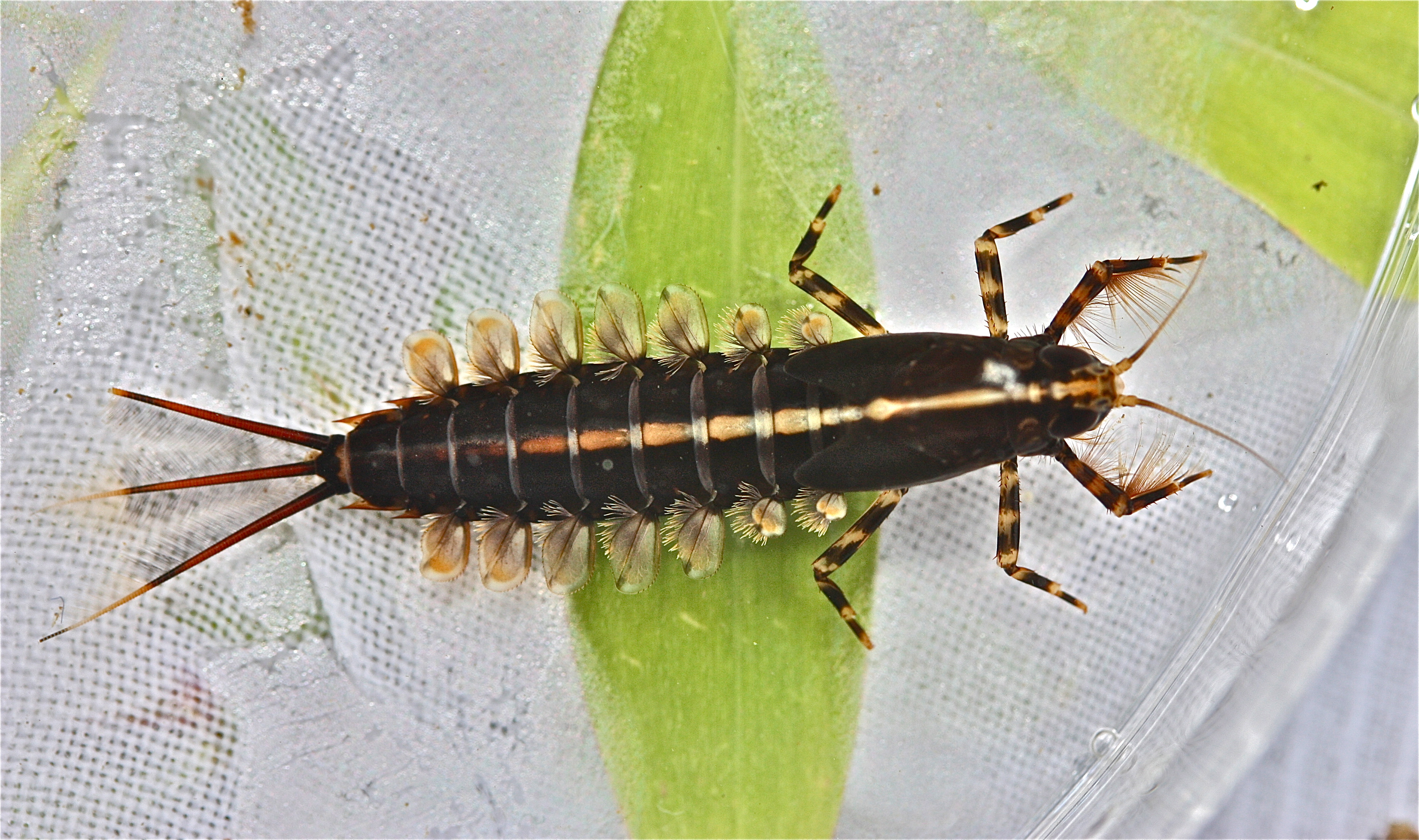

Scientific classification
- Domain: Eukaryota
- Kingdom: Animalia
- Phylum: Arthropoda
- Class: Insecta
- Order: Ephemeroptera
- Family: Isonychiidae
- Genus: Isonychia
- Species: I. bicolor

Binomial name
- Isonychia bicolor (Walker, 1853)

Synonyms
- Chirotonetes albomanicatus Needham, 1905; Isonychia albomanicata (Needham, 1905); Isonychia christina Traver, 1934; Isonychia circe Traver, 1934; Isonychia fattigi Traver, 1934; Isonychia harperi Traver, 1934; Isonychia matilda Traver, 1934; Isonychia pacoleta Traver, 1932; Isonychia sadleri Traver, 1934; Palingenia bicolor Walker, 1853

= Isonychia bicolor =

Species of mayfly

Isonychia bicolor, the mahogany dun, is a species of brushlegged mayfly in the family Isonychiidae. It is found in North America.
