= Elaphropus borneensis =

Scientific classification
- Kingdom: Animalia
- Phylum: Arthropoda
- Class: Insecta
- Order: Coleoptera
- Suborder: Adephaga
- Family: Carabidae
- Genus: Elaphropus
- Species: E. borneensis

Binomial name
- Elaphropus borneensis (Andrewes, 1925)

Species of beetle

Elaphropus borneensis is a species of ground beetle in the subfamily Trechinae. It was described by Andrewes in 1925.
