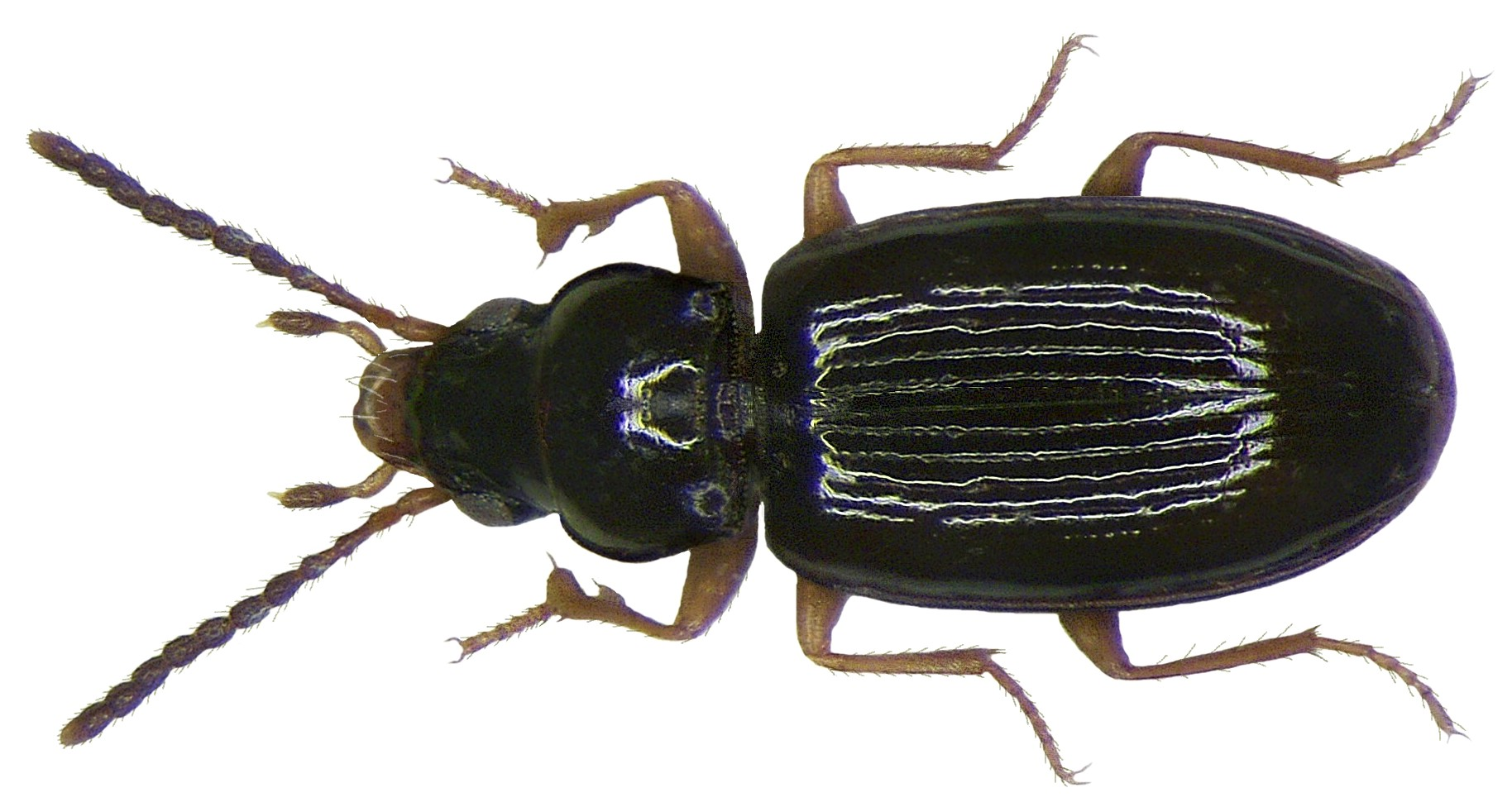

Scientific classification
- Kingdom: Animalia
- Phylum: Arthropoda
- Class: Insecta
- Order: Coleoptera
- Suborder: Adephaga
- Family: Carabidae
- Genus: Elaphropus
- Species: E. parvulus

Binomial name
- Elaphropus parvulus (Dejean, 1831)

= Elaphropus parvulus =

Species of beetle

Elaphropus parvulus is a species of ground beetle in the family Carabidae. It is found in North America, Europe, temperate Asia, and Africa.
