= Acanthametropus =

Scientific classification
- Domain: Eukaryota
- Kingdom: Animalia
- Phylum: Arthropoda
- Class: Insecta
- Order: Ephemeroptera
- Family: Acanthametropodidae
- Genus: Acanthametropus; Tshernova, 1948

Genus of mayflies

Acanthametropus is a genus of mayflies in the family Acanthametropodidae. There are at least two described species in Acanthametropus.

== Species ==
These two species belong to the genus Acanthametropus:

- Acanthametropus nikolskyi Tshernova, 1948
- Acanthametropus pecatonica (Burks, 1953)
