= Elaphropus renoicus =

Scientific classification
- Kingdom: Animalia
- Phylum: Arthropoda
- Class: Insecta
- Order: Coleoptera
- Suborder: Adephaga
- Family: Carabidae
- Genus: Elaphropus
- Species: E. renoicus

Binomial name
- Elaphropus renoicus (Casey, 1918)

Species of beetle

Elaphropus renoicus is a species of ground beetle in the subfamily Trechinae. It was described by Casey in 1918.
