= Arthroplea congener =

Scientific classification
- Kingdom: Animalia
- Phylum: Arthropoda
- Clade: Pancrustacea
- Class: Insecta
- Order: Ephemeroptera
- Family: Arthropleidae
- Genus: Arthroplea
- Species: A. congener

Binomial name
- Arthroplea congener Bengtsson, 1908

Species of mayfly

Arthroplea congener is a species of mayflies belonging to the family Heptageniidae.

It is native to Europe.
