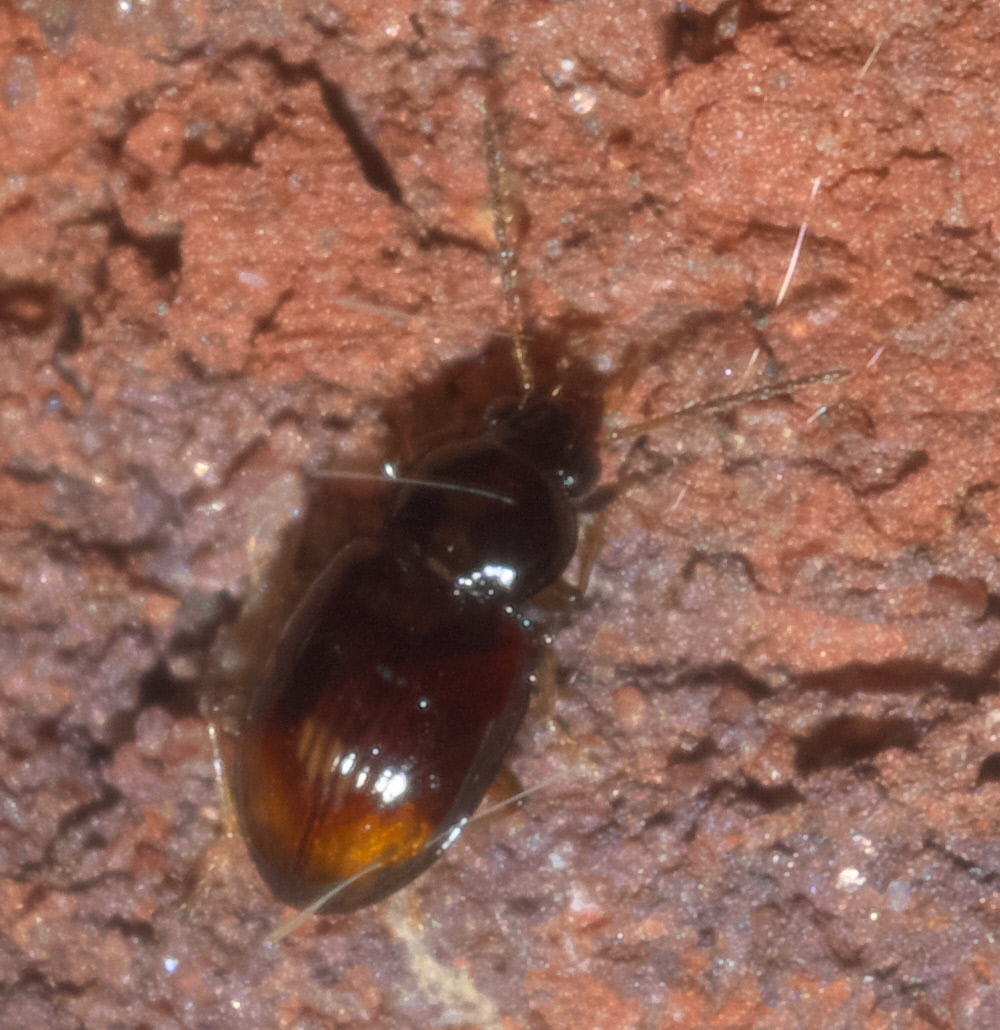
- Elaphropus xanthopus

Scientific classification
- Kingdom: Animalia
- Phylum: Arthropoda
- Class: Insecta
- Order: Coleoptera
- Suborder: Adephaga
- Family: Carabidae
- Genus: Elaphropus
- Species: E. xanthopus

Binomial name
- Elaphropus xanthopus (Dejean, 1831)

Synonyms
- Bembidium xanthopus Dejean, 1831; Elaphropus levipes (Casey, 1918); Tachyura ancilla Casey, 1918; Tachyura levipes Casey, 1918; Tachyura (xanthopus) famelica Casey, 1918; Tachyura (xanthopus) laxipennis Casey, 1918

= Elaphropus xanthopus =

Species of beetle

Elaphropus xanthopus is a species of ground beetle in the family Carabidae. It is found in North America.
