= Elaphropus nigritulus =

Scientific classification
- Kingdom: Animalia
- Phylum: Arthropoda
- Class: Insecta
- Order: Coleoptera
- Suborder: Adephaga
- Family: Carabidae
- Genus: Elaphropus
- Species: E. nigritulus

Binomial name
- Elaphropus nigritulus (Burgeon, 1935)

Species of beetle

Elaphropus nigritulus is a species of ground beetle in the subfamily Trechinae. It was described by Burgeon in 1935.
