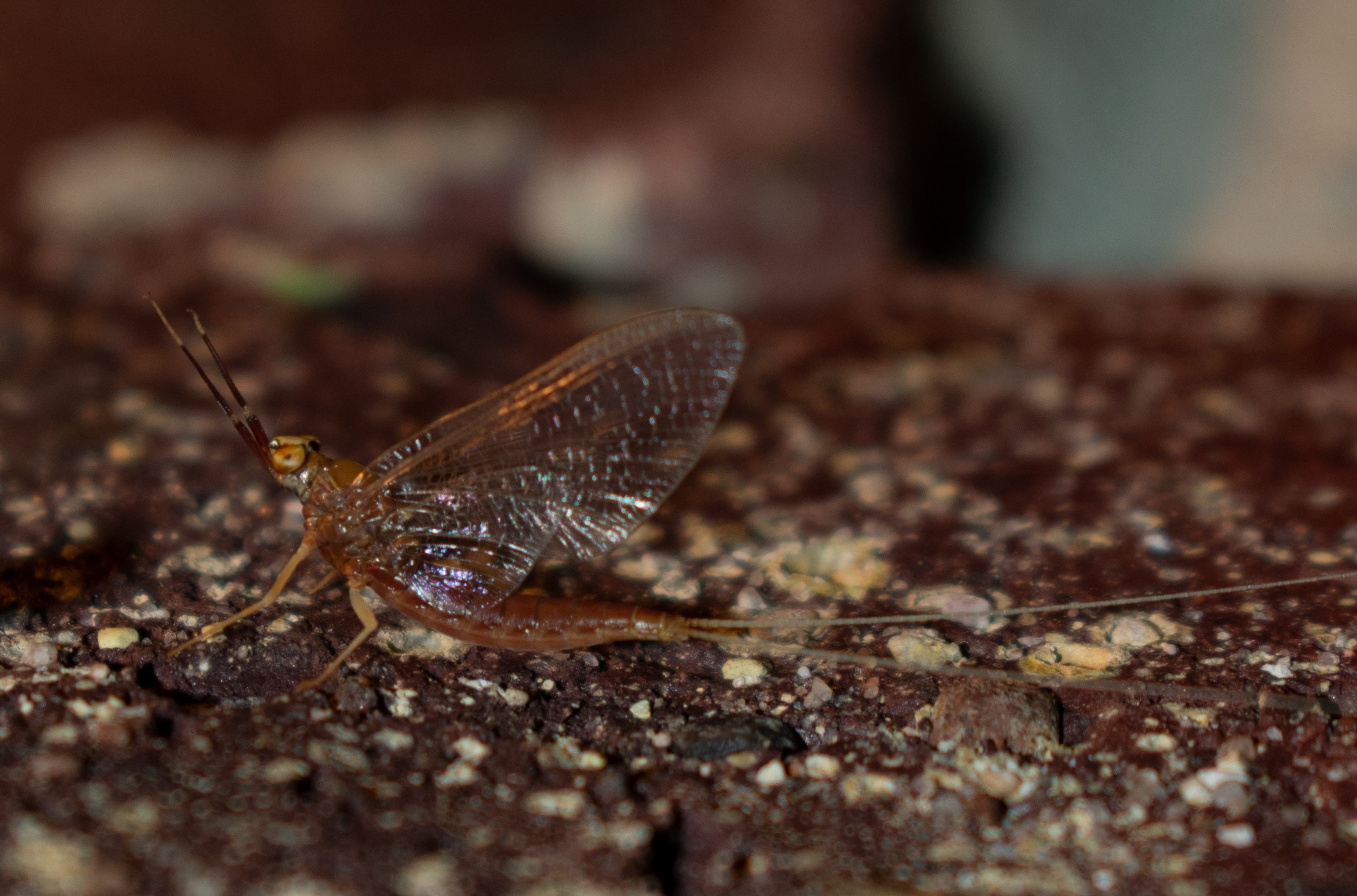

Scientific classification
- Domain: Eukaryota
- Kingdom: Animalia
- Phylum: Arthropoda
- Class: Insecta
- Order: Ephemeroptera
- Family: Isonychiidae
- Genus: Isonychia
- Species: I. velma

Binomial name
- Isonychia velma Needham, 1932

= Isonychia velma =

Species of mayfly

Isonychia velma is a species of brushlegged mayfly in the family Isonychiidae. It is found in North America.
