= Isonychia sicca =

Scientific classification
- Domain: Eukaryota
- Kingdom: Animalia
- Phylum: Arthropoda
- Class: Insecta
- Order: Ephemeroptera
- Family: Isonychiidae
- Genus: Isonychia
- Species: I. sicca

Binomial name
- Isonychia sicca (Walsh, 1862)

Synonyms
- Baetis sicca Walsh, 1862; Chirotenetes mancus (Eaton, 1871); Chirotonetes mancus (Eaton, 1871); Isonychia edmundsi Kondratieff and Voshell, 1984; Isonychia manca Eaton, 1871; Isonychia sicca manca Eaton, 1871

Species of mayfly

Isonychia sicca is a species of brushlegged mayfly in the family Isonychiidae. It is found in Central America and North America. In North America its range includes southeastern Canada, and all of Mexico.
