= Elaphropus anceps =

Scientific classification
- Domain: Eukaryota
- Kingdom: Animalia
- Phylum: Arthropoda
- Class: Insecta
- Order: Coleoptera
- Suborder: Adephaga
- Family: Carabidae
- Genus: Elaphropus
- Species: E. anceps

Binomial name
- Elaphropus anceps (LeConte, 1848)

Species of beetle

Elaphropus anceps is a species of ground beetle in the family Carabidae.
