= Isonychia rufa =

Scientific classification
- Domain: Eukaryota
- Kingdom: Animalia
- Phylum: Arthropoda
- Class: Insecta
- Order: Ephemeroptera
- Family: Isonychiidae
- Genus: Isonychia
- Species: I. rufa

Binomial name
- Isonychia rufa McDunnough, 1931

Species of mayfly

Isonychia rufa is a species of brushlegged mayfly in the family Isonychiidae and the bicolor group. It was originally named by McDunnough in 1931. It is found in central North America, from southern Manitoba to Oklahoma. Isonychia rufa is commonly found in larger rivers and streams from the Mississippi drainage. Isonychia rufa can be distinguished from other species in the bicolor group through certain characteristics present in male imago. These include: whiteish and light yellowish veins in the forewing hyaline, dorsal penes with a relatively prominent basal swelling which forms lateral and apical ridges, bright red to reddish orange brown abdomen, and stigmatic cross veins (usually anastomosed).
