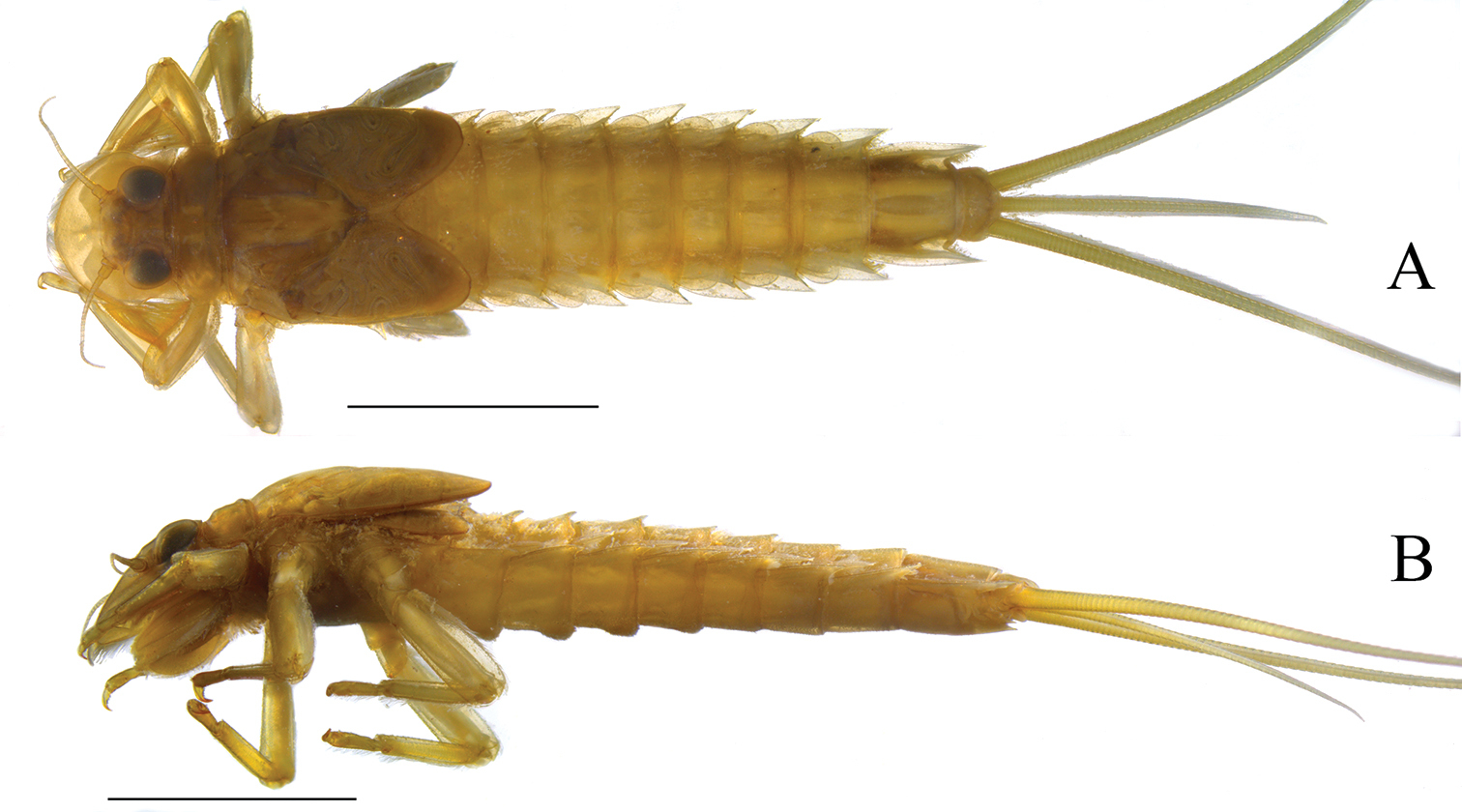
- Nymph of Oligoneuriopsis jessicae

Scientific classification
- Kingdom: Animalia
- Phylum: Arthropoda
- Class: Insecta
- Order: Ephemeroptera
- Suborder: Pisciforma
- Superfamily: Heptagenioidea
- Family: Oligoneuriidae; Ulmer, 1914

Genera
- See text

= Oligoneuriidae =

Oligoneuriidae Temporal range: Aptian–Present

Family of mayflies

Oligoneuriidae is a family of mayflies with a pantropical distribution. They are also known as brushlegged mayflies due to the presence of two rows of setae used for filtration on the front legs of their nymphs. Nymphs also have tufts of gills at the base of their maxillae. There are at least 68 described species in over a dozen genera.

== Genera ==
After

- Subfamily Oligoneuriinae Ulmer, 1914
  - Homoeoneuria Eaton, 1881
  - Lachlania Hagen, 1868
  - Oligoneuria Pictet, 1843
  - Oligoneuriopsis Crass, 1947
  - Spaniophlebia Eaton, 1881
  - Elassoneuria Eaton 1881
  - Yawari Salles, Soares, Massariol & Faria, 2014
  - Madeconeuria Demoulin, 1973
  - Fittkauneuria Pescador & Edmunds, 1994
  - Rianilaneuria Pescador & Peters, 2007
- Subfamily Chromarcyinae Demoulin, 1953
  - Chromarcys Navás, 1932
- Subfamily †Incogemininae Storari et al. 2020
  - †Incogemina Storari et al. 2020 Crato Formation, Brazil, Early Cretaceous (Aptian)
- Subfamily †Colocrurinae McCafferty, 1990
  - †Colocrus McCafferty 1990 Crato Formation, Brazil, Early Cretaceous (Aptian)
