= Acanthametropodidae =

Scientific classification
- Domain: Eukaryota
- Kingdom: Animalia
- Phylum: Arthropoda
- Class: Insecta
- Order: Ephemeroptera
- Suborder: Pisciforma
- Family: Acanthametropodidae

Family of mayflies

Acanthametropodidae is a family of sand-dwelling mayflies in the order Ephemeroptera and suborder Pisciforma. There are at least two genera and four described species in Acanthametropodidae.

== Genera ==
These two genera belong to the family Acanthametropodidae:

- Acanthametropus Tshernova, 1948
- Analetris Edmunds, 1972
