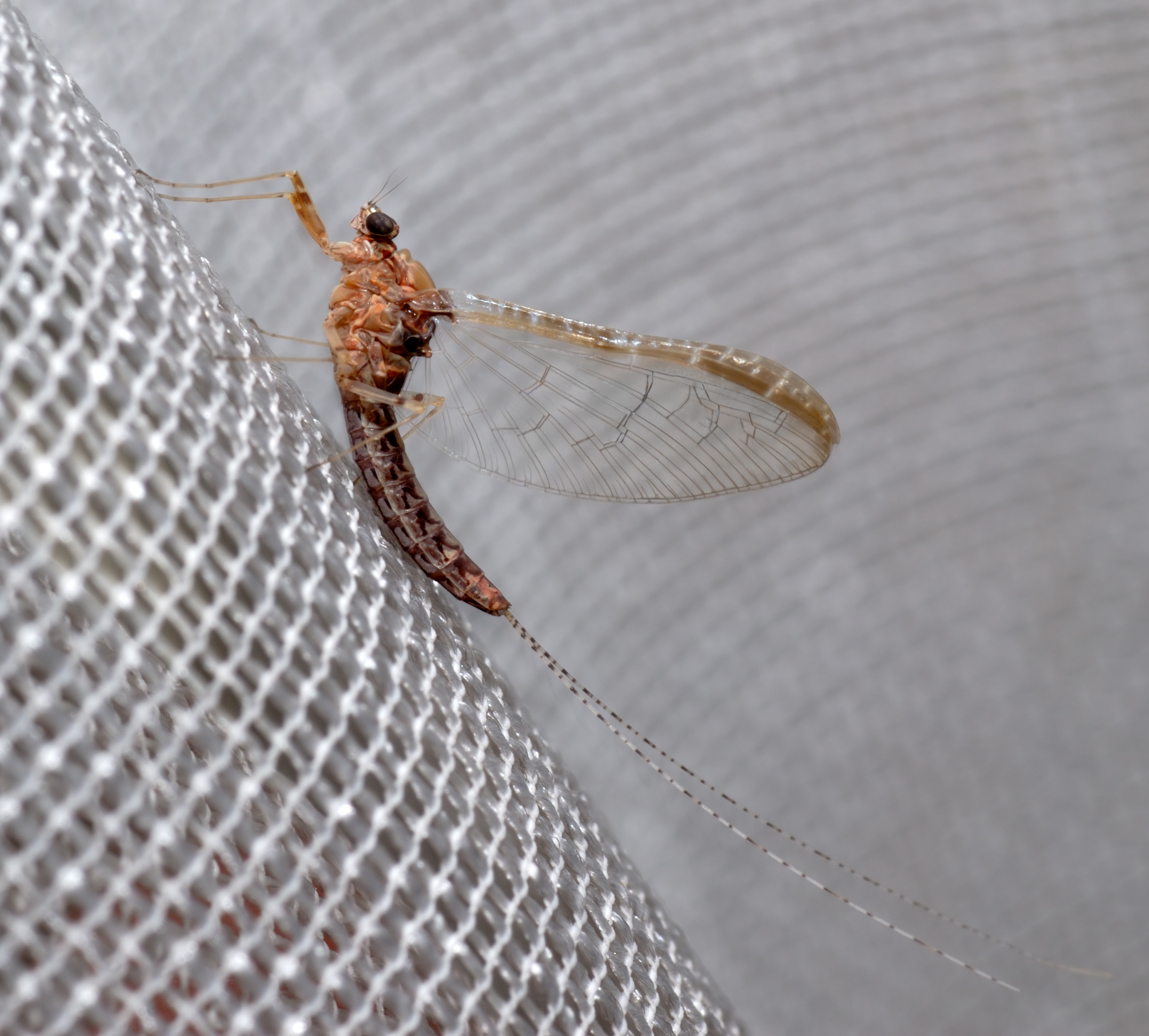
- Cloeon dipterum

Scientific classification
- Domain: Eukaryota
- Kingdom: Animalia
- Phylum: Arthropoda
- Class: Insecta
- Order: Ephemeroptera
- Suborder: Pisciforma

= Pisciforma =

Suborder of mayflies

Pisciforma is a suborder of mayflies in the order Ephemeroptera. There are at least 410 described species in Pisciforma.

== Families ==
- Acanthametropodidae (sand-dwelling mayflies)
- Ameletidae (combmouthed minnow mayflies)
- Ametropodidae (sand minnows)
- Arthropleidae (flatheaded mayflies)
- Baetidae (small minnow mayflies)
- Heptageniidae (flatheaded mayflies)
- Isonychiidae (brushlegged mayflies)
- Metretopodidae (cleftfooted minnow mayflies)
- Oligoneuriidae (brushleg mayflies)
- Pseudironidae (crabwalker mayflies)
- Siphlonuridae (primitive minnow mayflies)
