= Arthropleidae =

Scientific classification
- Domain: Eukaryota
- Kingdom: Animalia
- Phylum: Arthropoda
- Class: Insecta
- Order: Ephemeroptera
- Suborder: Pisciforma
- Superfamily: Heptagenioidea
- Family: Arthropleidae

Family of mayflies

Arthropleidae is a family of flatheaded mayflies in the order Ephemeroptera. There are at least two genera, one of which is extinct, in Arthropleidae.

== Genera ==
These two genera belong to the family Arthropleidae:

- Arthroplea Bengtsson, 1908
- † Electrogenia Demoulin, 1956
