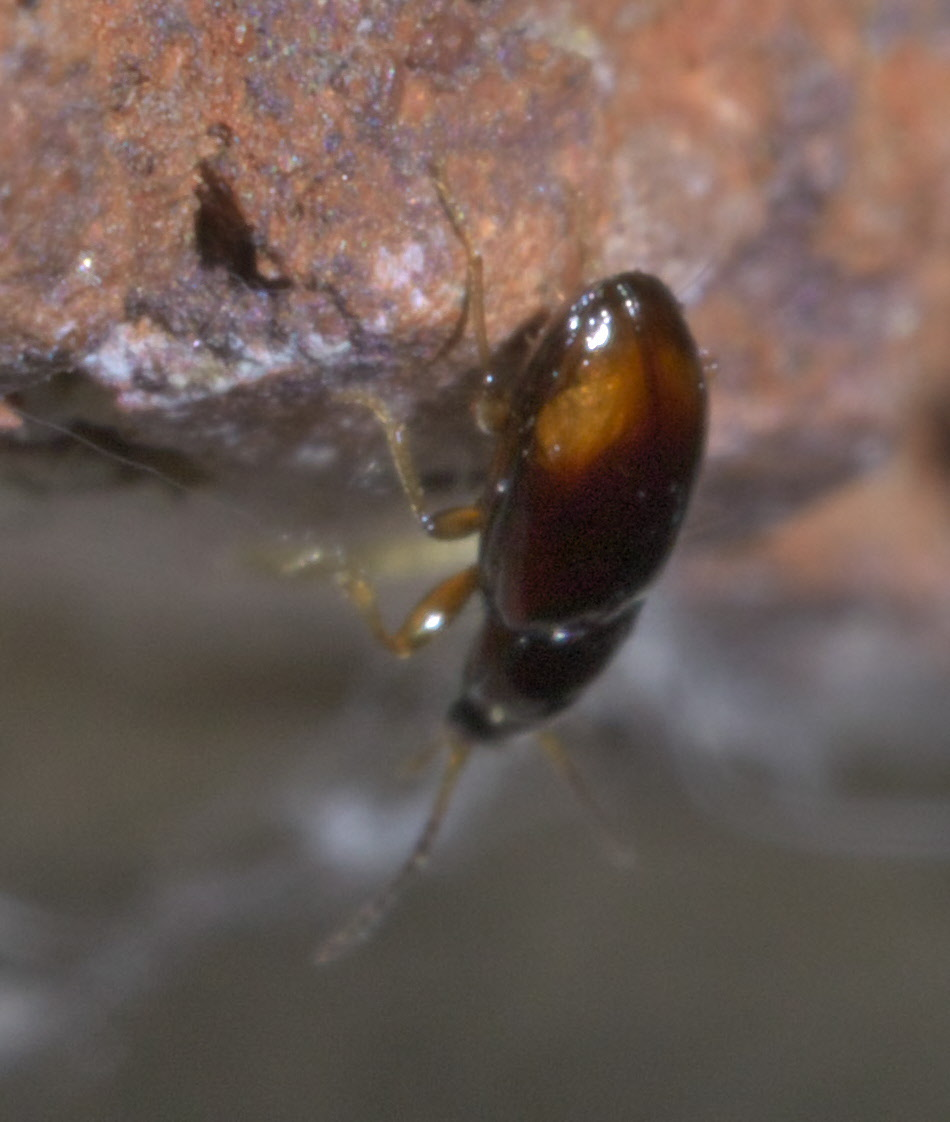

Scientific classification
- Kingdom: Animalia
- Phylum: Arthropoda
- Clade: Pancrustacea
- Class: Insecta
- Order: Coleoptera
- Suborder: Adephaga
- Family: Carabidae
- Subfamily: Trechinae
- Genus: Elaphropus; Motschulsky, 1839

Diversity
- at least 370 species

= Elaphropus =

Genus of beetles

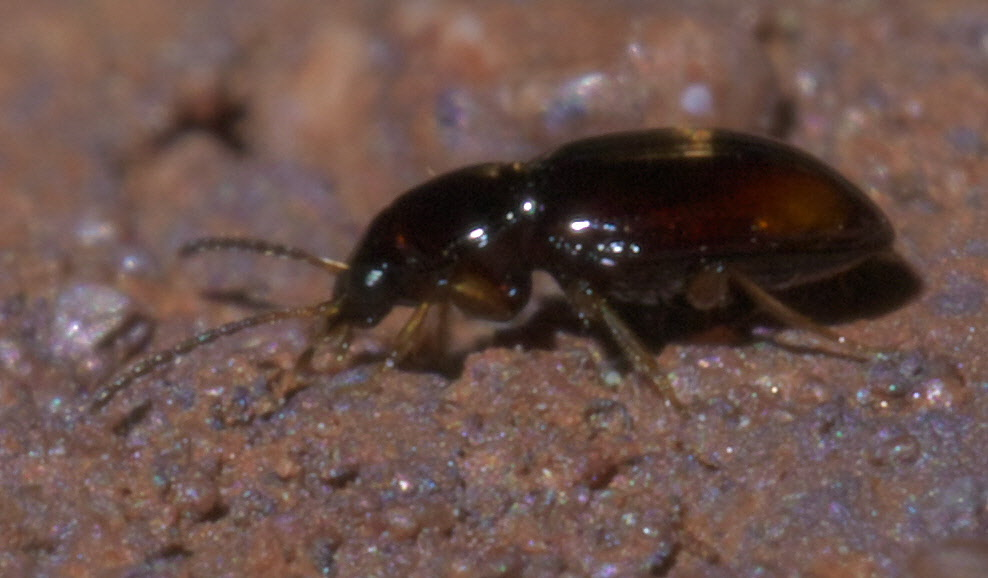

Elaphropus is a genus of ground beetles in the family Carabidae. There are at least 370 described species in the genus Elaphropus.

== See also ==
- List of Elaphropus species
