= Heterachthes tenellus =

Scientific classification
- Kingdom: Animalia
- Phylum: Arthropoda
- Class: Insecta
- Order: Coleoptera
- Suborder: Polyphaga
- Infraorder: Cucujiformia
- Family: Cerambycidae
- Genus: Heterachthes
- Species: H. tenellus

Binomial name
- Heterachthes tenellus (Burmeister, 1865)

Species of beetle

Heterachthes tenellus is a species of beetle in the family Cerambycidae. It was described by Hermann Burmeister in 1865.
