= Heterachthes congener =

Scientific classification
- Kingdom: Animalia
- Phylum: Arthropoda
- Class: Insecta
- Order: Coleoptera
- Suborder: Polyphaga
- Infraorder: Cucujiformia
- Family: Cerambycidae
- Genus: Heterachthes
- Species: H. congener

Binomial name
- Heterachthes congener Martins, 1965

Species of beetle

Heterachthes congener is a species of beetle in the family Cerambycidae.
