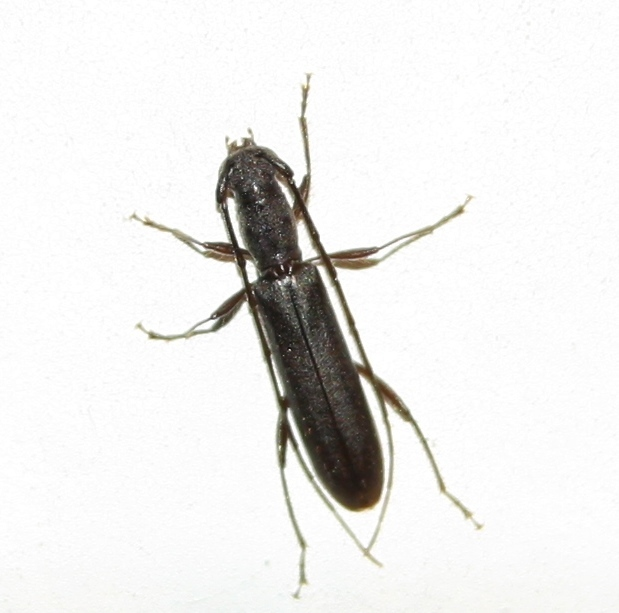

Scientific classification
- Kingdom: Animalia
- Phylum: Arthropoda
- Class: Insecta
- Order: Coleoptera
- Suborder: Polyphaga
- Infraorder: Cucujiformia
- Family: Cerambycidae
- Genus: Heterachthes
- Species: H. ebenus

Binomial name
- Heterachthes ebenus Newman, 1840

= Heterachthes ebenus =

Species of beetle

Heterachthes ebenus is a species of beetle in the family Cerambycidae. It was described by Newman in 1840.
