= Heterachthes texanus =

Scientific classification
- Kingdom: Animalia
- Phylum: Arthropoda
- Class: Insecta
- Order: Coleoptera
- Suborder: Polyphaga
- Infraorder: Cucujiformia
- Family: Cerambycidae
- Genus: Heterachthes
- Species: H. texanus

Binomial name
- Heterachthes texanus Linsley, 1957

Species of beetle

Heterachthes texanus is a species of beetle in the family Cerambycidae. It was described by Linsley in 1957.
