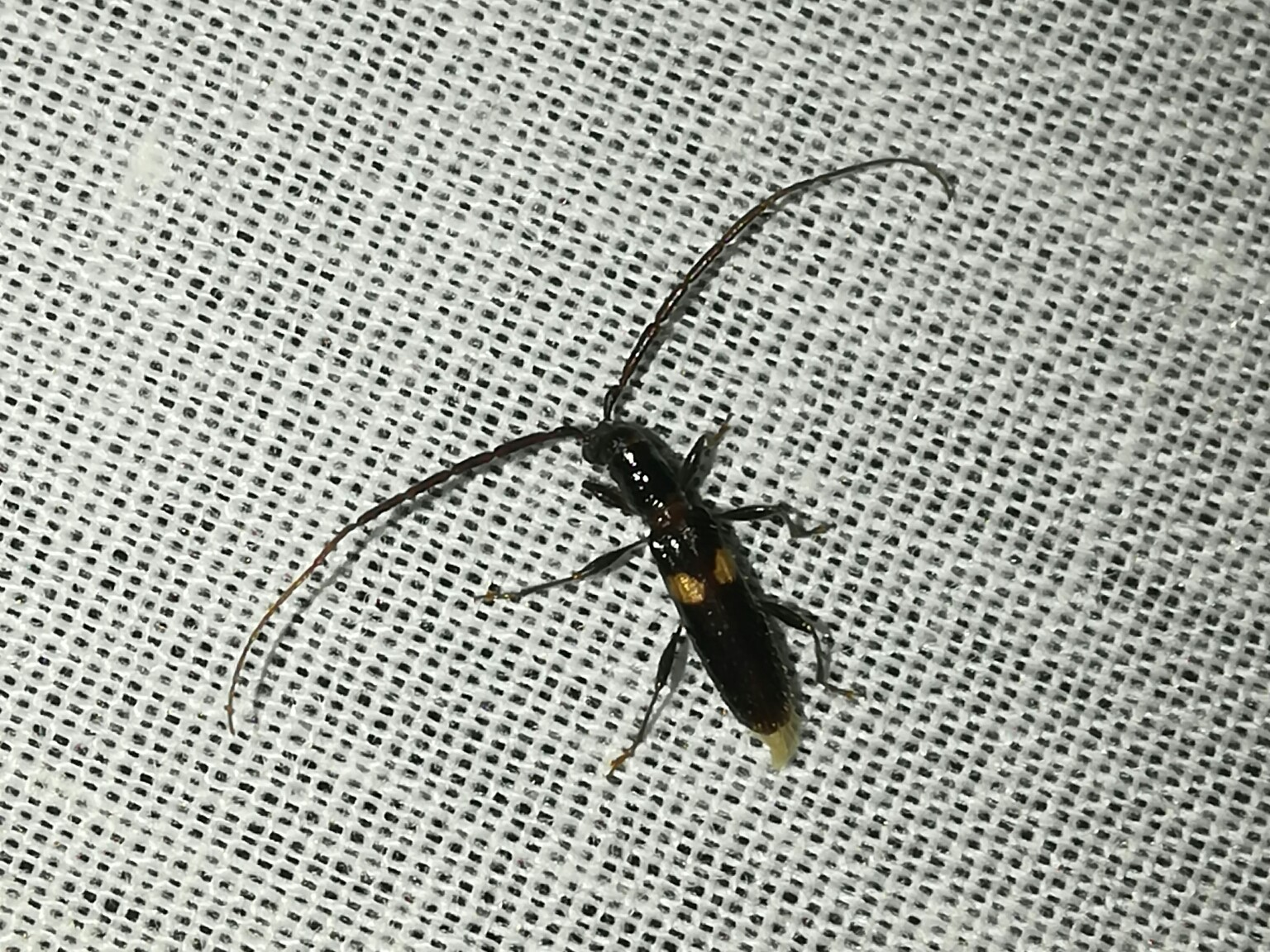

Scientific classification
- Kingdom: Animalia
- Phylum: Arthropoda
- Class: Insecta
- Order: Coleoptera
- Suborder: Polyphaga
- Infraorder: Cucujiformia
- Family: Cerambycidae
- Genus: Heterachthes
- Species: H. howdeni

Binomial name
- Heterachthes howdeni Martins, 1970

= Heterachthes howdeni =

Species of beetle

Heterachthes howdeni is a species of beetle in the family Cerambycidae. It was described by Martins in 1970.
