= Heterachthes castaneus =

Scientific classification
- Kingdom: Animalia
- Phylum: Arthropoda
- Class: Insecta
- Order: Coleoptera
- Suborder: Polyphaga
- Infraorder: Cucujiformia
- Family: Cerambycidae
- Genus: Heterachthes
- Species: H. castaneus

Binomial name
- Heterachthes castaneus Martins, 1970

Species of beetle

Heterachthes castaneus is a species of beetle in the family Cerambycidae.
