= Heterachthes v-flavum =

Scientific classification
- Kingdom: Animalia
- Phylum: Arthropoda
- Class: Insecta
- Order: Coleoptera
- Suborder: Polyphaga
- Infraorder: Cucujiformia
- Family: Cerambycidae
- Genus: Heterachthes
- Species: H. v-flavum

Binomial name
- Heterachthes v-flavum Martins, 2009

Synonyms
- Heterachthes v-flavus Martins, 2009

Species of beetle

Heterachthes v-flavum is a species of beetle in the family Cerambycidae. It was described by Martins in 2009. Under Article 31.2.1 of the International Code of Zoological Nomenclature, the species name must be spelled v-flavum, despite being originally spelled v-flavus by the original author, as letters of the alphabet are neuter in gender.
