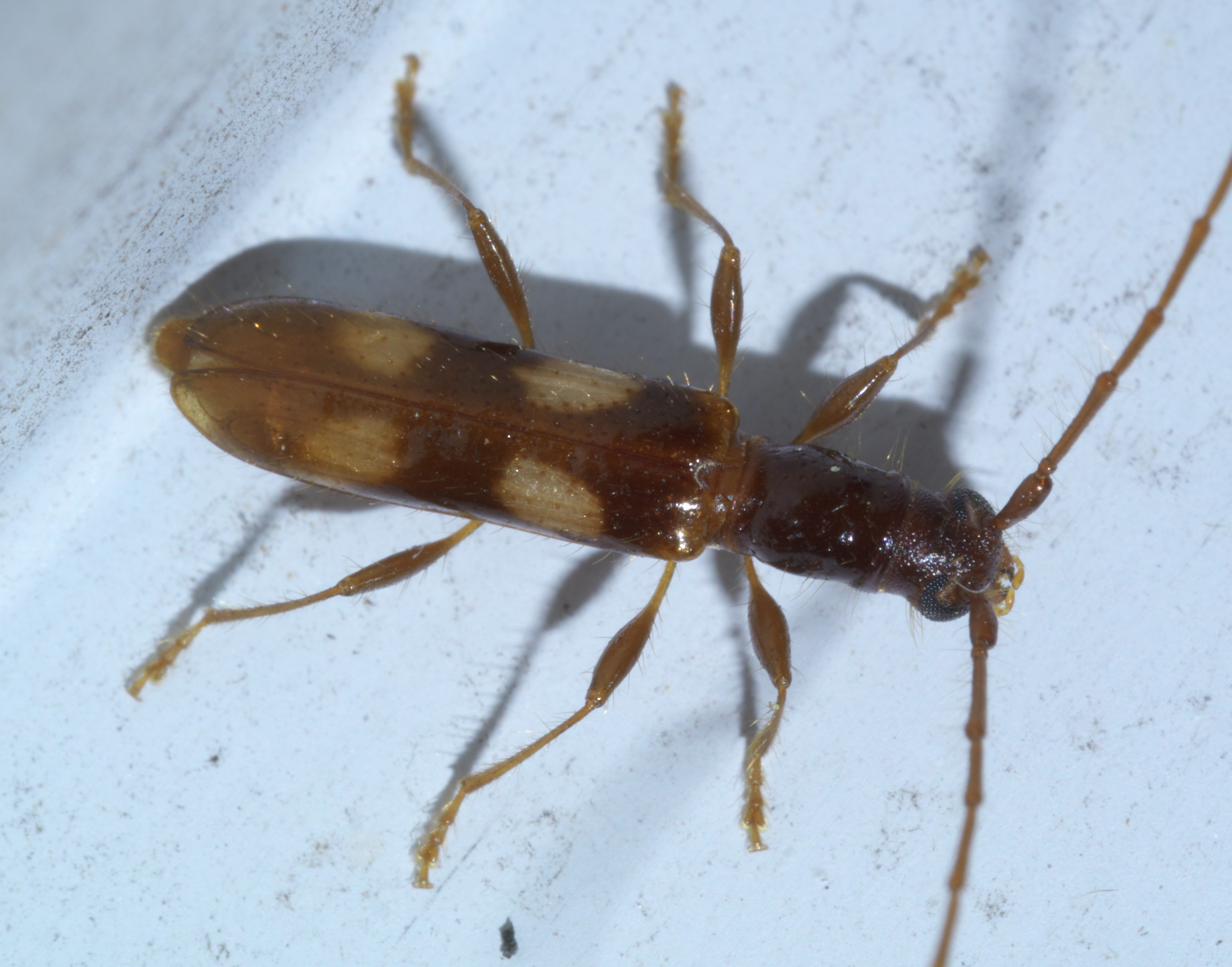
- Heterachthes quadrimaculatus

Scientific classification
- Domain: Eukaryota
- Kingdom: Animalia
- Phylum: Arthropoda
- Class: Insecta
- Order: Coleoptera
- Suborder: Polyphaga
- Infraorder: Cucujiformia
- Family: Cerambycidae
- Subfamily: Cerambycinae
- Tribe: Ibidionini
- Genus: Heterachthes; Newman, 1840

= Heterachthes =

Genus of beetles

Heterachthes is a genus of beetles in the family Cerambycidae, containing the following species:

- Heterachthes aeneolus Bates, 1885
- Heterachthes annulicornis Martins, 2009
- Heterachthes apicalis (Blair, 1933)
- Heterachthes beatrizae Noguera, 2005
- Heterachthes bilineatus (Bates, 1885)
- Heterachthes candidus (Bates, 1885)
- Heterachthes castaneus Martins, 1970
- Heterachthes concretus Martins, 1970
- Heterachthes congener Martins, 1965
- Heterachthes delicatus Martins, 2009
- Heterachthes designatus Martins, 1970
- Heterachthes dimidiatus (Thomson, 1865)
- Heterachthes ebenus Newman, 1840
- Heterachthes erineus Martins, 1970
- Heterachthes exiguus Martins, 2009
- Heterachthes fascinatus Martins, 1971
- Heterachthes figuratus Martins, 1970
- Heterachthes flavicornis (Thomson, 1865)
- Heterachthes fraterculus Martins & Napp, 1986
- Heterachthes gratiosus Martins, 1970
- Heterachthes gutta Martins, 2009
- Heterachthes howdeni Martins, 1970
- Heterachthes hystricosus Martins, 1971
- Heterachthes integripennis (Bates, 1885)
- Heterachthes inustus Gounelle, 1909
- Heterachthes laesicollis (Germar, 1824)
- Heterachthes lateralis Martins, 1962
- Heterachthes lemniscus Martins, 1970
- Heterachthes leucoacnus Martins, 1970
- Heterachthes longiscapus Martins, 1970
- Heterachthes martinsi Hovore, 1988
- Heterachthes mediovittatus Martins, 1962
- Heterachthes mucuni Martins & Galileo, 1999
- Heterachthes myrrheus Gounelle, 1910
- Heterachthes neocompsoides Giesbert, 1998
- Heterachthes nigrocinctus Bates, 1872
- Heterachthes nobilis LeConte, 1862
- Heterachthes pallidipennis (Thomson, 1865)
- Heterachthes paraiba Martins, 2009
- Heterachthes pelonioides (Thomson, 1867)
- Heterachthes picturatus Martins, 1970
- Heterachthes plagiatus (Burmeister, 1865)
- Heterachthes polingi (Fall, 1925)
- Heterachthes quadrimaculatus Haldeman, 1847
- Heterachthes rafaeli Galileo & Martins, 2011
- Heterachthes rubricolor Melzer, 1935
- Heterachthes rugosicollis Martins, 1970
- Heterachthes sablensis Blatchley, 1920
- Heterachthes sejunctus Gounelle, 1909
- Heterachthes sexguttatus (Audinet-Serville, 1834)
- Heterachthes signaticollis (Thomson, 1865)
- Heterachthes similis Martins, 1965
- Heterachthes spilotus Martins, 1971
- Heterachthes symbolus Martins, 1970
- Heterachthes taquatinga Martins, 2009
- Heterachthes tenellus (Burmeister, 1865)
- Heterachthes texanus Linsley, 1957
- Heterachthes tysiphonis (Thomson, 1867)
- Heterachthes unituberosus Martins & Galileo, 1999
- Heterachthes v-flavum Martins, 2009
- Heterachthes vauriae Martins, 1971
- Heterachthes viticulus Martins, 1970
- Heterachthes w-notatum Linsley, 1935
- Heterachthes wappesi Martins & Napp, 1986
- Heterachthes x-notatum (Linsley, 1935)
- Heterachthes xenocerus Martins, 1960
- Heterachthes xyleus Martins, 1974
