= Heterachthes laesicollis =

Scientific classification
- Kingdom: Animalia
- Phylum: Arthropoda
- Class: Insecta
- Order: Coleoptera
- Suborder: Polyphaga
- Infraorder: Cucujiformia
- Family: Cerambycidae
- Genus: Heterachthes
- Species: H. laesicollis

Binomial name
- Heterachthes laesicollis (Germar, 1824)

Species of beetle

Heterachthes laesicollis is a species of beetle in the family Cerambycidae. It was described by Ernst Friedrich Germar in 1824.
