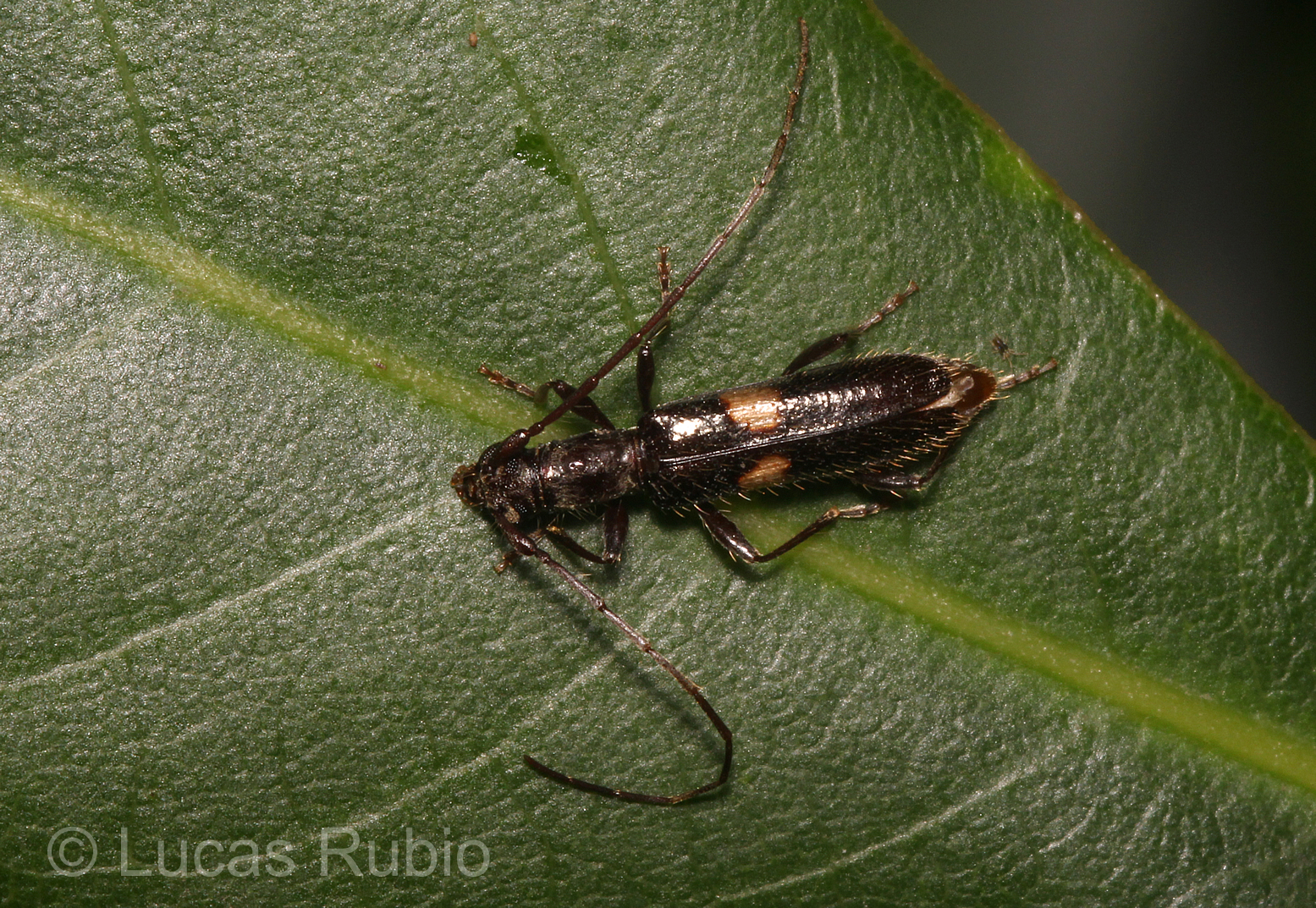

Scientific classification
- Kingdom: Animalia
- Phylum: Arthropoda
- Class: Insecta
- Order: Coleoptera
- Suborder: Polyphaga
- Infraorder: Cucujiformia
- Family: Cerambycidae
- Genus: Heterachthes
- Species: H. plagiatus

Binomial name
- Heterachthes plagiatus (Burmeister, 1865)

= Heterachthes plagiatus =

Species of beetle

Heterachthes plagiatus is a species of beetle in the family Cerambycidae. It was described by Hermann Burmeister in 1865.
