= Heterachthes sexguttatus =

Scientific classification
- Kingdom: Animalia
- Phylum: Arthropoda
- Class: Insecta
- Order: Coleoptera
- Suborder: Polyphaga
- Infraorder: Cucujiformia
- Family: Cerambycidae
- Genus: Heterachthes
- Species: H. sexguttatus

Binomial name
- Heterachthes sexguttatus (Audinet-Serville, 1834)

Species of beetle

Heterachthes sexguttatus is a species of beetle in the family Cerambycidae. It was described by Audinet-Serville in 1834.
