= Heterachthes mucuni =

Scientific classification
- Kingdom: Animalia
- Phylum: Arthropoda
- Class: Insecta
- Order: Coleoptera
- Suborder: Polyphaga
- Infraorder: Cucujiformia
- Family: Cerambycidae
- Genus: Heterachthes
- Species: H. mucuni

Binomial name
- Heterachthes mucuni Martins & Galileo, 1999

Species of beetle

Heterachthes mucuni is a species of beetle in the family Cerambycidae. It was described by Martins and Galileo in 1999.
