= Heterachthes leucoacnus =

Scientific classification
- Kingdom: Animalia
- Phylum: Arthropoda
- Class: Insecta
- Order: Coleoptera
- Suborder: Polyphaga
- Infraorder: Cucujiformia
- Family: Cerambycidae
- Genus: Heterachthes
- Species: H. leucoacnus

Binomial name
- Heterachthes leucoacnus Martins, 1970

Species of beetle

Heterachthes leucoacnus is a species of beetle in the family Cerambycidae. It was described by Martins in 1970.
