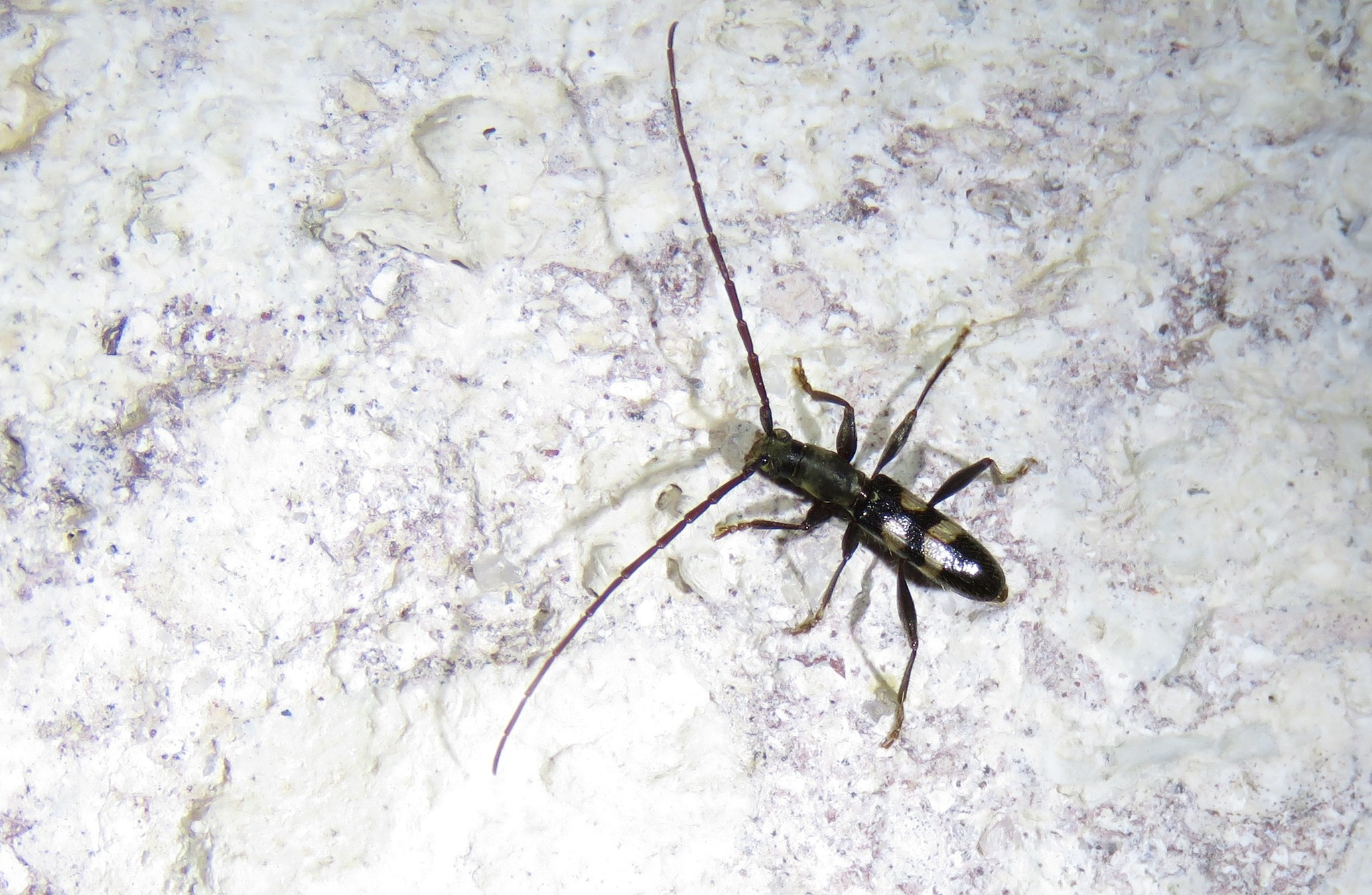

Scientific classification
- Kingdom: Animalia
- Phylum: Arthropoda
- Class: Insecta
- Order: Coleoptera
- Suborder: Polyphaga
- Infraorder: Cucujiformia
- Family: Cerambycidae
- Genus: Heterachthes
- Species: H. fraterculus

Binomial name
- Heterachthes fraterculus Martins & Napp, 1986

= Heterachthes fraterculus =

Species of beetle

Heterachthes fraterculus is a species of beetle in the family Cerambycidae. It was described by Martins and Napp in 1986.
