= Heterachthes rubricolor =

Scientific classification
- Kingdom: Animalia
- Phylum: Arthropoda
- Class: Insecta
- Order: Coleoptera
- Suborder: Polyphaga
- Infraorder: Cucujiformia
- Family: Cerambycidae
- Genus: Heterachthes
- Species: H. rubricolor

Binomial name
- Heterachthes rubricolor Melzer, 1935

Species of beetle

Heterachthes rubricolor is a species of beetle in the family Cerambycidae. It was described by Melzer in 1935.
