= Heterachthes myrrheus =

Scientific classification
- Kingdom: Animalia
- Phylum: Arthropoda
- Class: Insecta
- Order: Coleoptera
- Suborder: Polyphaga
- Infraorder: Cucujiformia
- Family: Cerambycidae
- Genus: Heterachthes
- Species: H. myrrheus

Binomial name
- Heterachthes myrrheus Gounelle, 1910

Species of beetle

Heterachthes myrrheus is a species of beetle in the family Cerambycidae. It was described by Gounelle in 1910.
