= Heterachthes annulicornis =

Scientific classification
- Kingdom: Animalia
- Phylum: Arthropoda
- Class: Insecta
- Order: Coleoptera
- Suborder: Polyphaga
- Infraorder: Cucujiformia
- Family: Cerambycidae
- Genus: Heterachthes
- Species: H. annulicornis

Binomial name
- Heterachthes annulicornis Martins, 2009

Species of beetle

Heterachthes annulicornis is a species of beetle in the family Cerambycidae.
