= Heterachthes x-notatum =

Scientific classification
- Kingdom: Animalia
- Phylum: Arthropoda
- Class: Insecta
- Order: Coleoptera
- Suborder: Polyphaga
- Infraorder: Cucujiformia
- Family: Cerambycidae
- Genus: Heterachthes
- Species: H. x-notatum

Binomial name
- Heterachthes x-notatum (Linsley, 1935)

Synonyms
- Ibidion x-notatum Linsley, 1935; Heterachthes x-notatus (Linsley, 1935)

Species of beetle

Heterachthes x-notatum is a species of beetle in the family Cerambycidae. It was described by Linsley in 1935. Under Article 31.2.1 of the International Code of Zoological Nomenclature, the species name must be spelled x-notatum, as letters of the alphabet are neuter in gender.
