= Heterachthes xenocerus =

Scientific classification
- Kingdom: Animalia
- Phylum: Arthropoda
- Class: Insecta
- Order: Coleoptera
- Suborder: Polyphaga
- Infraorder: Cucujiformia
- Family: Cerambycidae
- Genus: Heterachthes
- Species: H. xenocerus

Binomial name
- Heterachthes xenocerus Martins, 1960

Species of beetle

Heterachthes xenocerus is a species of beetle in the family Cerambycidae. It was described by Martins in 1960.
