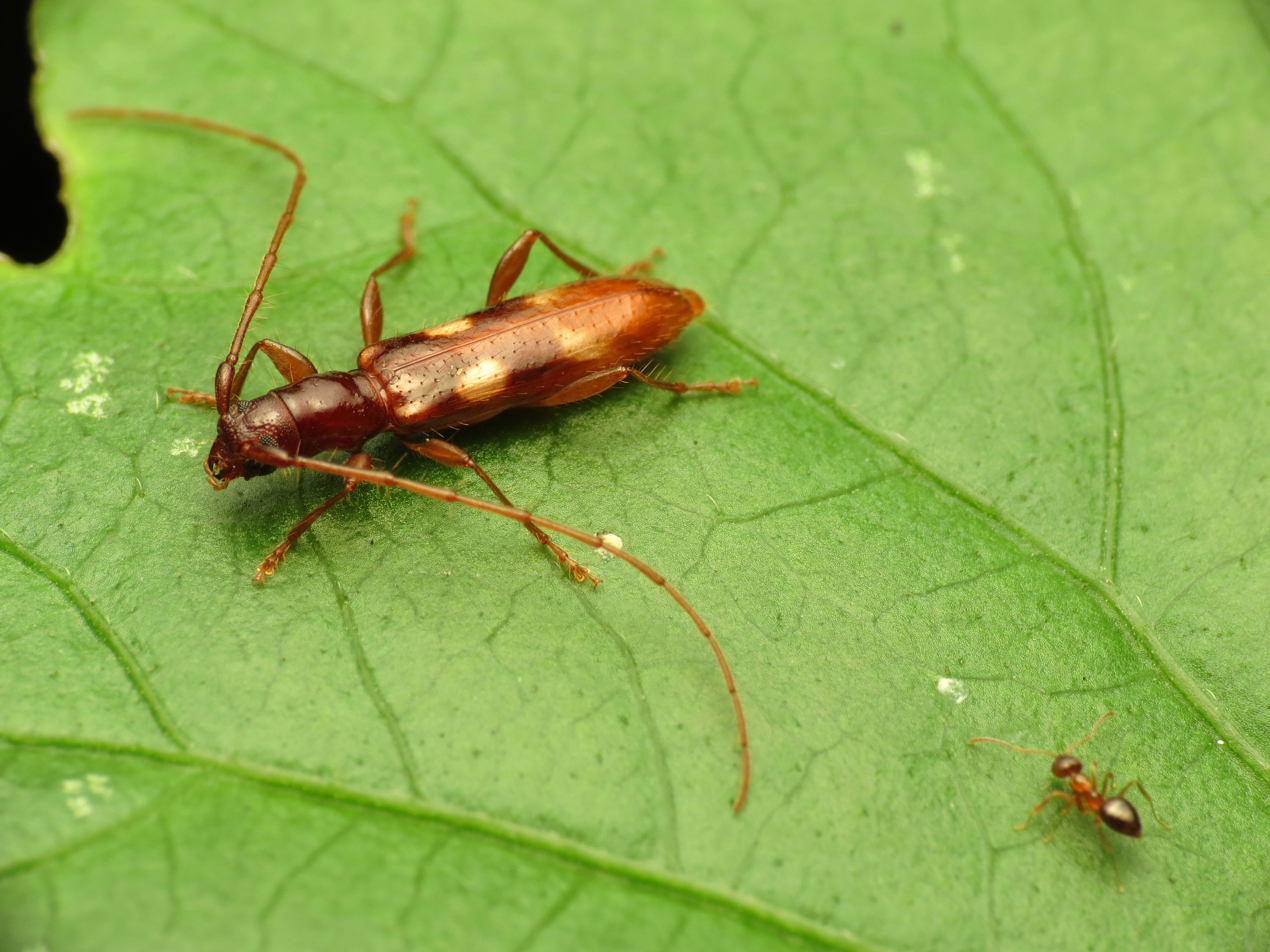

Scientific classification
- Kingdom: Animalia
- Phylum: Arthropoda
- Class: Insecta
- Order: Coleoptera
- Suborder: Polyphaga
- Infraorder: Cucujiformia
- Family: Cerambycidae
- Genus: Heterachthes
- Species: H. quadrimaculatus

Binomial name
- Heterachthes quadrimaculatus Haldeman, 1847

= Heterachthes quadrimaculatus =

Species of beetle

Heterachthes quadrimaculatus is a species of beetle in the family Cerambycidae. It was described by Haldeman in 1847. Its host plant is Carya glabra.
