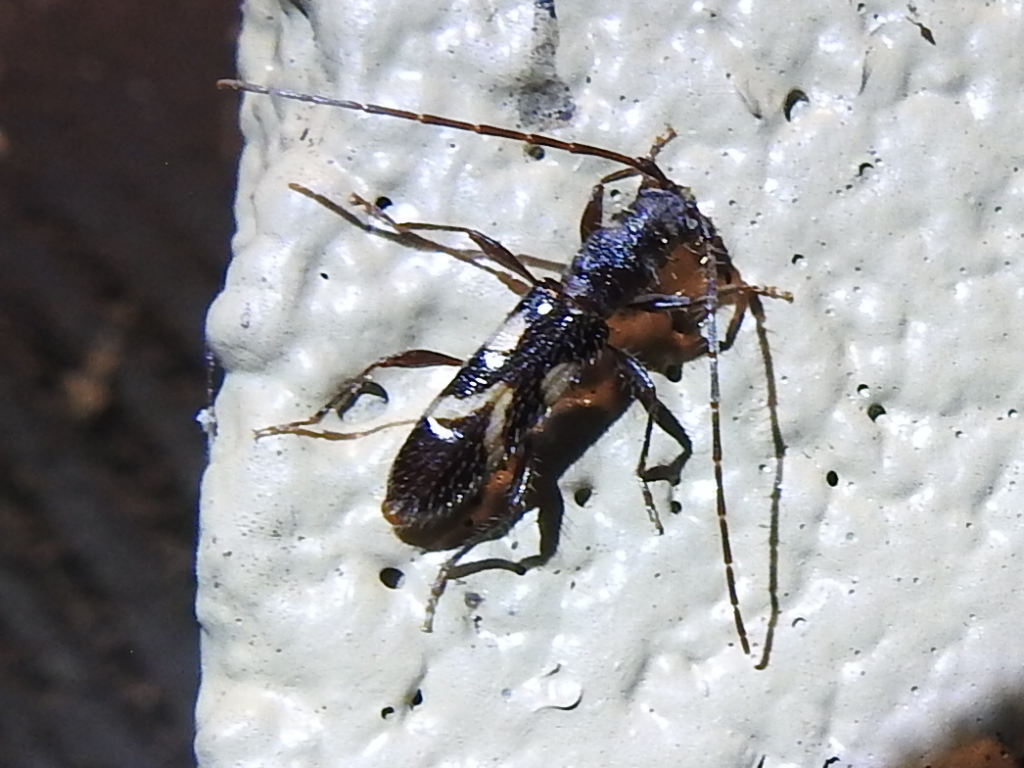

Scientific classification
- Kingdom: Animalia
- Phylum: Arthropoda
- Class: Insecta
- Order: Coleoptera
- Suborder: Polyphaga
- Infraorder: Cucujiformia
- Family: Cerambycidae
- Genus: Heterachthes
- Species: H. nobilis

Binomial name
- Heterachthes nobilis LeConte, 1862

= Heterachthes nobilis =

Species of beetle

Heterachthes nobilis is a species of beetle in the family Cerambycidae. It was described by John Lawrence LeConte in 1862.
