= Heterachthes beatrizae =

Scientific classification
- Kingdom: Animalia
- Phylum: Arthropoda
- Class: Insecta
- Order: Coleoptera
- Suborder: Polyphaga
- Infraorder: Cucujiformia
- Family: Cerambycidae
- Genus: Heterachthes
- Species: H. beatrizae

Binomial name
- Heterachthes beatrizae Noguera, 2005

Species of beetle

Heterachthes beatrizae is a species of beetle in the family Cerambycidae.
