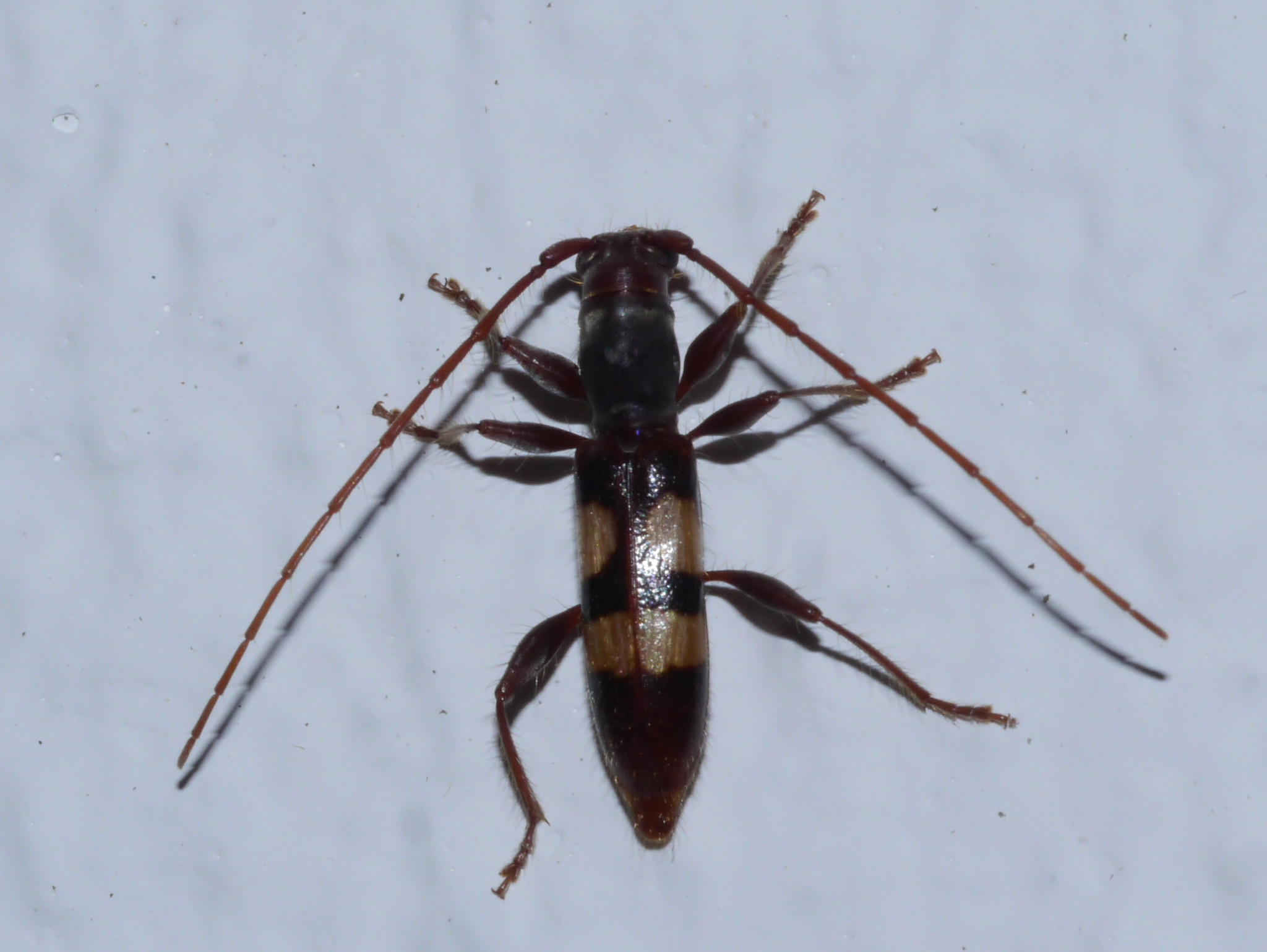

Scientific classification
- Kingdom: Animalia
- Phylum: Arthropoda
- Class: Insecta
- Order: Coleoptera
- Suborder: Polyphaga
- Infraorder: Cucujiformia
- Family: Cerambycidae
- Genus: Heterachthes
- Species: H. wappesi

Binomial name
- Heterachthes wappesi Martins & Napp, 1986

= Heterachthes wappesi =

Species of beetle

Heterachthes wappesi is a species of beetle in the family Cerambycidae. It was described by Martins and Napp in 1986.
