= Heterachthes polingi =

Scientific classification
- Kingdom: Animalia
- Phylum: Arthropoda
- Class: Insecta
- Order: Coleoptera
- Suborder: Polyphaga
- Infraorder: Cucujiformia
- Family: Cerambycidae
- Genus: Heterachthes
- Species: H. polingi

Binomial name
- Heterachthes polingi (Fall, 1925)

Species of beetle

Heterachthes polingi is a species of beetle in the family Cerambycidae. It was described by Fall in 1925.
