= Heterachthes martinsi =

Scientific classification
- Kingdom: Animalia
- Phylum: Arthropoda
- Class: Insecta
- Order: Coleoptera
- Suborder: Polyphaga
- Infraorder: Cucujiformia
- Family: Cerambycidae
- Genus: Heterachthes
- Species: H. martinsi

Binomial name
- Heterachthes martinsi Hovore, 1988

Species of beetle

Heterachthes martinsi is a species of beetle in the family Cerambycidae. It was described by Hovore in 1988.
