= Heterachthes dimidiatus =

Scientific classification
- Kingdom: Animalia
- Phylum: Arthropoda
- Class: Insecta
- Order: Coleoptera
- Suborder: Polyphaga
- Infraorder: Cucujiformia
- Family: Cerambycidae
- Genus: Heterachthes
- Species: H. dimidiatus

Binomial name
- Heterachthes dimidiatus (Thomson, 1865)

Species of beetle

Heterachthes dimidiatus is a species of beetle in the family Cerambycidae. It was described by Thomson in 1865.
