= Heterachthes apicalis =

Scientific classification
- Kingdom: Animalia
- Phylum: Arthropoda
- Class: Insecta
- Order: Coleoptera
- Suborder: Polyphaga
- Infraorder: Cucujiformia
- Family: Cerambycidae
- Genus: Heterachthes
- Species: H. apicalis

Binomial name
- Heterachthes apicalis (Blair, 1933)

Species of beetle

Heterachthes apicalis is a species of beetle in the family Cerambycidae.
