= Heterachthes neocompsoides =

Scientific classification
- Kingdom: Animalia
- Phylum: Arthropoda
- Class: Insecta
- Order: Coleoptera
- Suborder: Polyphaga
- Infraorder: Cucujiformia
- Family: Cerambycidae
- Genus: Heterachthes
- Species: H. neocompsoides

Binomial name
- Heterachthes neocompsoides Giesbert, 1998

Species of beetle

Heterachthes neocompsoides is a species of beetle in the family Cerambycidae. It was described by Giesbert in 1998.
