= Heterachthes paraiba =

Scientific classification
- Kingdom: Animalia
- Phylum: Arthropoda
- Class: Insecta
- Order: Coleoptera
- Suborder: Polyphaga
- Infraorder: Cucujiformia
- Family: Cerambycidae
- Genus: Heterachthes
- Species: H. paraiba

Binomial name
- Heterachthes paraiba Martins, 2009

Species of beetle

Heterachthes paraiba is a species of beetle in the family Cerambycidae. It was described by Martins in 2009.
