= Heterachthes hystricosus =

Scientific classification
- Kingdom: Animalia
- Phylum: Arthropoda
- Class: Insecta
- Order: Coleoptera
- Suborder: Polyphaga
- Infraorder: Cucujiformia
- Family: Cerambycidae
- Genus: Heterachthes
- Species: H. hystricosus

Binomial name
- Heterachthes hystricosus Martins, 1971

Species of beetle

Heterachthes hystricosus is a species of beetle in the family Cerambycidae. It was described by Martins in 1971.

== Description ==
This beetle has a red-brown head and thorax. The elytra, legs and antennae are light brown. The antennae are longer than the body.
