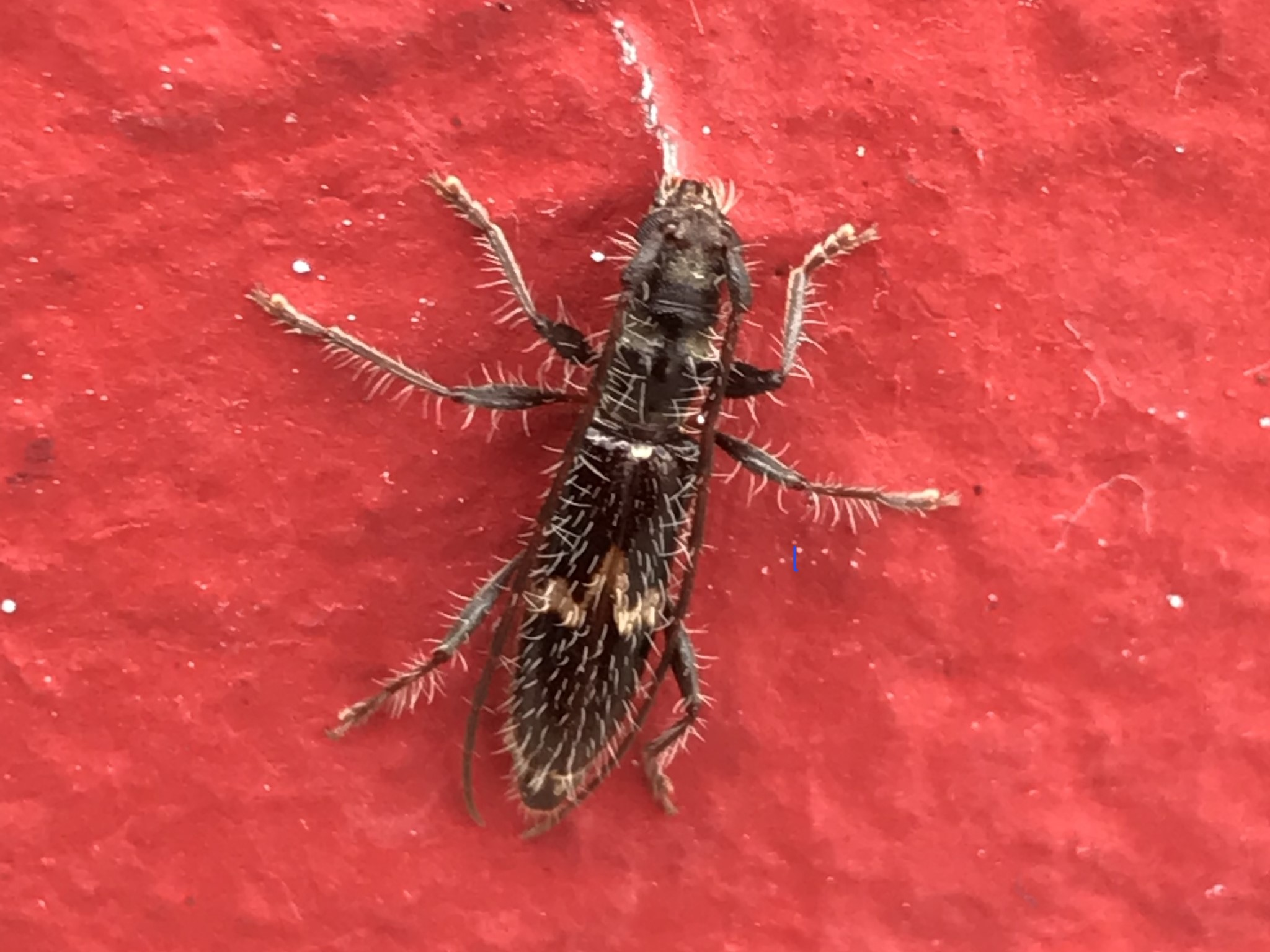

Scientific classification
- Kingdom: Animalia
- Phylum: Arthropoda
- Class: Insecta
- Order: Coleoptera
- Suborder: Polyphaga
- Infraorder: Cucujiformia
- Family: Cerambycidae
- Genus: Heterachthes
- Species: H. w-notatum

Binomial name
- Heterachthes w-notatum Linsley, 1935

Synonyms
- Heterachthes w-notata Linsley, 1935 (misspelling); Heterachthes w-notatus Auctt. (misspelling)

= Heterachthes w-notatum =

Species of beetle

Heterachthes w-notatum is a species of beetle in the family Cerambycidae. It was described by Linsley in 1935. It is found in Mexico. Under Article 31.2.1 of the International Code of Zoological Nomenclature, the species name must be spelled w-notatum, despite being spelled w-notata by the original author, as letters of the alphabet are neuter in gender.
