= Heterachthes sablensis =

Scientific classification
- Kingdom: Animalia
- Phylum: Arthropoda
- Class: Insecta
- Order: Coleoptera
- Suborder: Polyphaga
- Infraorder: Cucujiformia
- Family: Cerambycidae
- Genus: Heterachthes
- Species: H. sablensis

Binomial name
- Heterachthes sablensis Blatchley, 1920

Species of beetle

Heterachthes sablensis is a species of beetle in the family Cerambycidae. It was described by Blatchley in 1920.
