= Heterachthes exiguus =

Scientific classification
- Kingdom: Animalia
- Phylum: Arthropoda
- Class: Insecta
- Order: Coleoptera
- Suborder: Polyphaga
- Infraorder: Cucujiformia
- Family: Cerambycidae
- Genus: Heterachthes
- Species: H. exiguus

Binomial name
- Heterachthes exiguus Martins, 2009

Species of beetle

Heterachthes exiguus is a species of beetle in the family Cerambycidae. It was described by Martins in 2009.
